= Fault tolerant quantum computing =

Classification of quantum processors

In quantum information, fault-tolerant quantum computing (FTQC) is the ability to reliably perform quantum computation despite the physical components of a quantum computer being prone to error. This is done in part via incorporating quantum error correction codes, although quantum error correction by itself is not sufficient to achieve arbitrarily low error rates. It is also achieved by constructing physical operations such that individual errors do not spread to the rest of the circuit, for example by using transversal gates.

Fault-tolerant quantum processors are theoretically possible. Using a quantum error correction scheme, the accuracy threshold theorem says that, once the physical error rate reaches a certain threshold, the logical error rate can be arbitrarily suppressed by concatenating error correcting codes. While this threshold has been crossed experimentally, fully fault tolerant quantum processors have yet to be realized, and are often seen as the primary end goal of quantum processor development.

The development of fault-tolerant quantum processors is an open research topic in quantum information. It is likely that advances at both the hardware and algorithm level are necessary for the transition from existing noisy intermediate-scale quantum (NISQ) processors to fault-tolerant quantum computers to occur.

== Background ==
=== Quantum errors ===
When quantum computers were initially theorized, it was unclear whether they would be able to overcome errors due to noise. It is harder to preserve information in qubits compared to classical bits due to the nature of their errors. While classical bits typically experience digital bit-flip errors alone, quantum bits are subject to continuous bit and phase flip error channels rather than digital errors, in the form of constant decoherence. Furthermore, the no-cloning theorem means that quantum information cannot be copied, and preserving a qubit in a given quantum state requires that its logical state not directly be measured. Therefore, classical repetition-based error correcting codes cannot be directly implemented in qubits.

=== Quantum error correction ===
In 1995, Peter Shor found the first quantum error correction code that could correct arbitrary single-qubit errors, known as the 9-qubit Shor code. The Shor code is a combination of a three-qubit bit-flip code and a three-qubit phase flip code and is seen as the quantum analog of a classical repetition code. Errors can be detected by measuring parity checks, which determine whether the sign of a group of qubits agrees. The measurement outcome is a binary code called a syndrome, and measuring it collapses the continuous error onto a discrete set of Pauli errors, therefore 'digitizing' the error. This showed that, in principle, quantum information could still be protected using redundany.

Soon after a seven-qubit Steane code was found as well. Eventually a whole family of similar quantum error correction codes was born. QECC codes are denoted$[[n, k, d]]$ , meaning a code with physical qubits n, which encodes k logical qubits at a code distance d. A code of distance d can correct $t = (d-1)/2$ errors.

=== Fault-tolerant architectures ===
While very useful, these codes assumed perfect gates, encoding and recovery operations, and syndrome extraction. However on a real device, all of these processes are noisy. Therefore quantum error correction alone is not sufficient to be fault-tolerant.

In the case of a QECC, a computation is fault-tolerant if a single error can create only a correctable number of errors within a code 'block'. The block in this case is the group of physical qubits that encode a single codeword of the error-correcting code. In the case of an $[[n, 1, d]]$ code, each logical qubit is made up of n physical qubits, and thus that is the code block. In practice, fault tolerance thus requires that errors should not be allowed to spread from one qubit to many other qubits within the same block.

Peter Shor developed the first fault-tolerant construction in 1996, where he was able to show that under certain assumptions, qubits could operate fault-tolerantly.

==== Logical gates ====
Ordinary two-qubit gates may allow errors to spread from a single physical qubit across the system faster than they could be addressed. Fault tolerant protocols employ transversal logical gates to ensure that a single fault can only produce at most one error per code block, preventing error spreading. A transversal gate is built only from physical gates that act on a single qubit per code block. In this way, a single fault can only produce at most one error per code block, preventing error spreading.

While transversal gates should be used whenever possible within fault-tolerant architectures, they alone cannot form a universal gate set required for universal quantum computation, according to the Eastin-Knill theorem.

=== Accuracy threshold theorem ===
In 1997, the accuracy threshold theorem was proved. It states that, under certain conditions, a quantum computer with a physical error rate below a certain threshold can suppress the logical error rate to arbitrarily low levels, even in the presence of noise and imperfect quantum gates. The proof of the threshold theorem meant that reliable quantum computing in the presence of noise and imperfect quantum gates was not only possible, but also scalable.

In 2018, John Preskill published a paper contrasting NISQ quantum processors with fully fault-tolerant devices. Since then, FTQC has become a standard term for a future era of quantum computing that employs error-corrected regimes beyond NISQ.

== From NISQ to FTQC ==
The proposed development of quantum computing from NISQ to FTQC is usually grouped into two or three 'eras' of devices as follows:

=== NISQ era ===
NISQ devices are sensitive to noise, and have a large number of degrees of freedom when compared to a classical computer, but not sufficiently large enough to perform error-correction effectively. The algorithms run on NISQ devices are usually classical-quantum hybrid algorithms such as the variational quantum eigensolver.

=== Early Fault Tolerant Quantum Computing (EFTQC) regime ===
The EFTQC era, or the early-FTQC era, is a proposed intermediate era between NISQ and FTQC which reduces the number of logical qubits, and thus limits the size of problems that can be solved, but in turn allowing for efficient fault-tolerant protocols. Quantum processors in the EFTQC regime would still be capable of solving relevant problems, such as simulating the Hubbard model.

As of 2025, basic fault-tolerant operations have been demonstrated in research settings. The Google Sycamore and Willow processors have shown that increasing the error correction code's distance (practically, increasing the number of physical qubits per logical qubit) improves the logical error rate per measurement round, indicating that early-FTQC devices are experimentally realizable. However, these technologies are far from the number of logical qubits necessary for practical FTQC.

=== FTQC regime ===
While early experimental results have shown that logical error rate can be improved, FTQC devices must also be able to demonstrate fault tolerance on a large scale in order to run fault-tolerant-level algorithms. Due to the importance of this criterion, the FTQC regime is sometimes instead referred to as the fault-tolerant application-scale quantum (FASQ) regime, to indicate that these devices must not only be fault-tolerant, but also that they are large enough to run various useful applications.

There is no hard cutoff for when a fault-tolerant quantum processor has reached the application-scale regime, and thus capable of real-world applications. One qualitative benchmark proposed by John Preskill is the "megaquop" machine, a proposed quantum processor which can execute on the order of a million coherent quantum operations before errors overwhelm computation.

Currently, because quantum error correction requires encoding information across multiple physical qubits, realizations of FTQC quantum processors would require very large numbers of physical qubits. For example, a 2048-bit RSA integer using Shor’s algorithm would require around one million superconducting qubits.

== Approaches to realizing FTQC devices ==
=== Topological stabilizer codes ===
One way FTQC devices can be realized is by grouping together multiple physical qubits to create a single logical qubit, and using error correction methods such as the surface code so that the combined system is fault-tolerant.

Stabilizer codes work by preparing and maintaining data qubits, using ancillary qubits to extract stabilizer outcomes, and repeating this extraction to distinguish between memory and data errors. Then, a decoder, which is usually a classical algorithm, will infer the most likely error configuration, and apply corrections accordingly. In this approach, logical gates between logical qubits are realized using lattice surgery.

Stabilizer codes are is useful because everything is local, which makes it compatible with existing 2D architectures such as superconducting chips. The major issue with this approach is its overhead; the number of physical qubits needed to achieve a single fault-tolerant logical qubit is large. As a result, it is difficult to scale. Another challenge to this approach is universality. It is not easy to do non-Clifford gates in a surface code system, but these gates are required for a complete gate set. One solution to this is magic-state distillation.

=== LDPC codes ===
In contrast to the surface code, LDPC codes allow logical qubits to scale proportionally with physical qubits, reducing the amount of overhead necessary for FTQC in comparison to stabilizer codes. However, LDPC codes require more complex connectivity, because parity checks may be further than the nearest-neighbor. As a result, LDPC-based FTQC would require significant improvements to hardware and architecture to be implemented at-scale.

=== Measurement-Based FTQC (MBQC) ===
MBQC starts with a vast, pre-entangled resource, such as a 2D or 3D "cluster state". Then, one performs specific single-qubit measurements on this cluster state. During these measurements, error correction codes like the surface code are implemented to protect logical qubits. The benefit of this approach is that once the large entangled state is generated, logical gate operations are simple.

This approach is especially promising for high-connectivity platforms like trapped ions and neutral atoms.

== See also ==
- Noisy intermediate-scale quantum computing
- Threshold theorem
- Quantum advantage
- Quantum error correction
- Fault tolerance
- Timeline of quantum computing and communication
