= Shor code =

Code used in quantum error correction

Quantum circuit to encode a single logical qubit with the Shor code. E indicates an error and the rest of the circuit to the right decodes the state.

In quantum computing, the Shor code or Shor nine qubit code is a foundational code in quantum error correction that protects quantum information against decoherence and operational errors. It was the first quantum error correcting code, introduced by Peter Shor in 1995. It encodes a single logical qubit into a system of nine physical qubits, allowing simultaneous correction of both bit-flip, phase-flip or a joint phase and bit flip errors on any single physical qubit. As the first quantum error-correcting code to demonstrate fault tolerant quantum computing in principle, the Shor code marked a critical step toward the development of reliable quantum computing systems.

The Shor code is a simple example of a Bacon–Shor code. These codes have the property that are constructed from local operations and repeating patterns, and introduce the ability to switching encoding dynamically (while the circuit is running) in a fault-tolerant manner.

== Description ==
=== Encoding states ===
Creation of each block. In this diagram, the Hadamard gate (H) creates a state $|+\rangle$ and the other two qubits are concatenated using Controlled NOT gates.

The Shor code encodes one logical qubit in 9 physical qubits. To construct the code, we first encode a state $\alpha|0\rangle+\beta|1\rangle$ to an encoding of three qubits, as
$$|0\rangle\to|+++\rangle$$
and
$$|1\rangle\to|---\rangle,$$
where $|\pm\rangle=(|0\rangle\pm|1\rangle)/\sqrt2$. In order to obtain the desired Shor logical $|0_{\rm L}\rangle$ and $|1_{\rm L}\rangle$ we use concatenation, that is, each of the three qubits is multiplied into a three qubit block, given by
$$|0_{\rm L}\rangle=\frac{1}{2\sqrt{2}}(|000\rangle + |111\rangle) \otimes (|000\rangle + |111\rangle
) \otimes (|000\rangle + |111\rangle)$$
and
$$|1_{\rm L}\rangle=\frac{1}{2\sqrt{2}}(|000\rangle - |111\rangle) \otimes (|000\rangle - |111\rangle
) \otimes (|000\rangle - |111\rangle).$$

=== Detection and correction ===
Qubits for three blocks (0,1,2), (3,4,5) and (6,7,8), where each block is protected from bit-flips and the three blocks are protected together from a phase flip on any of the blocks. Thus the Shor code can correct any bit and/or phase flip errors in any single qubit. It can also correct two bit flips as long as the errors occur in separate blocks.

Due to discretization of errors it can be shown that any unitary transformation on a single qubit can be corrected just by correcting bit flips and phase flips errors.

=== Logical gates ===
One can define logical Pauli gates for the Shor code, where the logical Pauli Z gate is given by

$$Z_{\mathrm L}=X\otimes X\otimes X\otimes X\otimes X\otimes X\otimes X\otimes X\otimes X,$$

where $X$ is the single qubit Pauli X gate. In the same manner a logical Pauli X is given by

$$X_{\mathrm L}=Z\otimes Z\otimes Z\otimes Z\otimes Z\otimes Z\otimes Z\otimes Z\otimes Z,$$
where $Z$ is the single qubit Pauli Z gate.

== Random error threshold ==
According to the threshold theorem a quantum error correction code can correct physical error if the error rate is below a certain threshold. If p is the probability of a random error happening on a single qubit, a conservative estimate can treat any error affecting two or more qubits as uncorrectable; this happens with probability
$$P_2(p)=1-(1-p)^9-9p(1-p)^8\approx 36p^2,$$
When $P_2(p)$ is larger than p itself (where we neglected terms with power larger than p^{3}), it is better to not use Shor code at all. In this case the threshold is approximately p=1/36=2.78%. However including errors in the error correction itself this value can drop to 10^{−4}.

== Stabilizer formalism ==
The Shor code is a [[9,1,3]] code (9 qubits, 1 logical qubit, distance 3), the later number indicates that it can correct at most a single qubit error. In the stabilizer formalism, the Shor code has 8 generators (6 bit flip and 2 phase flip parity checks):

$$\begin{array}{c|ccccccccc}
& 1 & 2 & 3 & 4 & 5 & 6 & 7 & 8 & 9 \\
\hline
g_1 & Z & Z & I & I & I & I & I & I & I \\
g_2 & I & Z & Z & I & I & I & I & I & I \\
g_3 & I & I & I & Z & Z & I & I & I & I \\
g_4 & I & I & I & I & Z & Z & I & I & I \\
g_5 & I & I & I & I & I & I & Z & Z & I \\
g_6 & I & I & I & I & I & I & I & Z & Z \\
g_7 & X & X & X & X & X & X & I & I & I \\
g_8 & I & I & I & X & X & X & X & X & X \\
\end{array}$$

As the Shor code has only X stabilizers and Z stabilizers (does not mix X and Z in the stabilizer), it is then considered a CSS code.

== See also ==
- Steane code
- Five-qubit error correcting code
