= CSS code =

Class of quantum error correcting codes

The$[[7, 1, 3]]$ Steane code is a popular CSS code which encodes one qubit.

In quantum error correction, Calderbank–Shor–Steane (CSS) codes, named after their inventors, Robert Calderbank, Peter Shor and Andrew Steane, are a special type of stabilizer code constructed from classical linear codes which satisfy the dual-orthogonality condition. Examples of CSS codes include the Shor code, Steane code, the toric code, and more general surface codes.

== Construction ==
Let $C_1$ and $C_2$ be two (classical) $[n,k_1]$ and $[n,k_2]$ linear codes such, that $C_2 \subset C_1$ and $C_1 , C_2^\perp$ both have minimal distance $\geq 2t+1$, where $C_2^\perp$ is the dual code to $C_2$. Then define $\text{CSS}(C_1,C_2)$, the CSS code of $C_1$ over $C_2$ as an $[n,k_1 - k_2, d]$ code, with $d \geq 2t+1$ as follows:

Define for
$$x \in C_1 : {{|}} x + C_2 \rangle  :=\frac1{\sqrt{ | C_2|} }\sum_{y \in C_2} {{|}} x + y \rangle,$$
where $+$ is bitwise addition modulo 2. Then $\text{CSS}(C_1,C_2)$ as quantum correcting code $[[n,k_1 - k_2, d]]$ defined as $\{ {{|}} x + C_2 \rangle \mid x \in C_1 \}$.

== Properties ==
In the stabilizer code formalism, all CSS codes have stabilizers composed of tensor products of Pauli matrices such that each stabilizer contains either only Pauli X operations or only Pauli Z operations. The Shor code and the Steane code are examples of this condition. The five-qubit error correcting code is not a CSS code because it mixes X and Z in its stabilizers.

As with classical linear codes, the limit of how many qubits can be corrected is also given by the Gilbert–Varshamov bound.
