= Bacon–Shor code =

Quantum error correcting code

The Bacon–Shor code is a subsystem error correcting code. In a subsystem code, information is encoded in a subsystem of a Hilbert space. Subsystem codes lend to simplified error correcting procedures unlike codes which encode information in the subspace of a Hilbert space. This simplicity led to the first claim of fault tolerant circuit demonstration on a quantum computer. It is named after Dave Bacon and Peter Shor.

Given the stabilizer generators of Shor's code: $\langle X_{0}X_{1}X_{2}X_{3}X_{4}X_{5}, X_{0}X_{1}X_{2}X_{6}X_{7}X_{8}, Z_{0}Z_{1}, Z_{1}Z_{2}, Z_{3}Z_{4}, Z_{4}Z_{5}, Z_{6}Z_{7}, Z_{7}Z_{8}\rangle$, 4 stabilizers can be removed from this generator by recognizing gauge symmetries in the code to get: $\langle X_{0}X_{1}X_{2}X_{3}X_{4}X_{5}, X_{0}X_{1}X_{2}X_{6}X_{7}X_{8}, Z_{0}Z_{1}Z_{3}Z_{4}Z_{6}Z_{7}, Z_{1}Z_{2}Z_{4}Z_{5}Z_{7}Z_{8} \rangle$. Error correction is now simplified because 4 stabilizers are needed to measure errors instead of 8. A gauge group can be created from the stabilizer generators:$\langle Z_{1}Z_{2}, X_{2}X_{8}, Z_{4}Z_{5}, X_{5}X_{8}, Z_{0}Z_{1}, X_{0}X_{6}, Z_{3}Z_{4}, X_{3}X_{6}, X_{1}X_{7}, X_{4}X_{7}, Z_{6}Z_{7}, Z_{7}Z_{8}\rangle$. Given that the Bacon–Shor code is defined on a square lattice where the qubits are placed on the vertices; laying the qubits on a grid in a way that corresponds to the gauge group shows how only 2 qubit nearest-neighbor measurements are needed to infer the error syndromes. The simplicity of deducing the syndromes reduces the overhead for fault tolerant error correction.

Geometry
q_{0}	ZZ	q_{1}	ZZ	q_{2}
XX		XX		XX
q_{6}	ZZ	q_{7}	ZZ	q_{8}
XX		XX		XX
q_{3}	ZZ	q_{4}	ZZ	q_{5}

== See also ==
- Five-qubit error correcting code
