= Quantum gate teleportation =

Type of quantum circuit construction

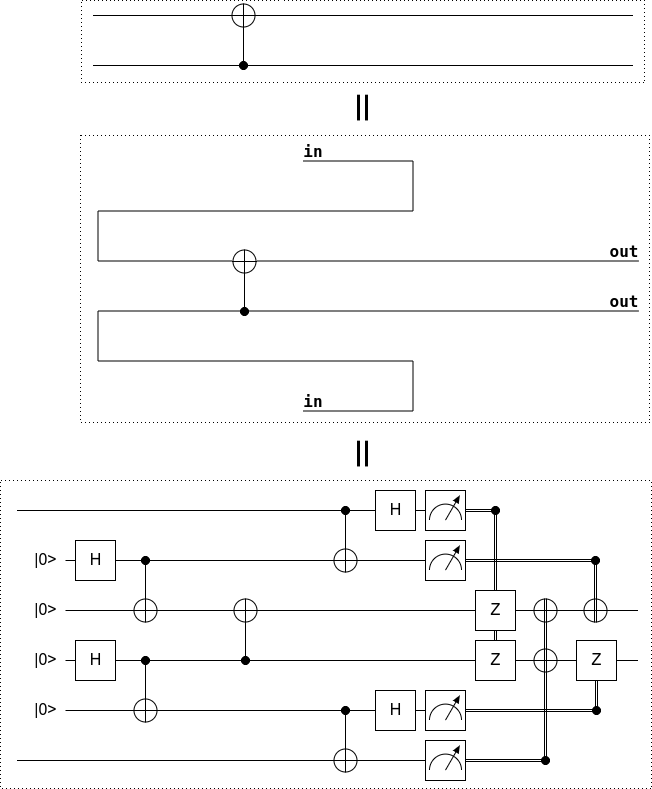
Applying a CNOT gate by using gate teleportation. Uses Bell basis measurement (decomposed here into a CNOT, an H, and two measurements), Bell basis initialization (decomposed here into two resets, an H, and a CNOT), and classical feedback in the form of Pauli operations controlled by the measurement results.

Quantum gate teleportation is a quantum circuit construction where a gate is applied to target qubits by first applying the gate to an entangled state and then teleporting the target qubits through that entangled state.

This separation of the physical application of the gate from the target qubit can be useful in cases where applying the gate directly to the target qubit may be more likely to destroy it than to apply the desired operation. For example, the KLM protocol can be used to implement a Controlled NOT gate on a photonic quantum computer, but the process can be prone to errors that destroy the target qubits. By using gate teleportation, the CNOT operation can be applied to a state that can be easily recreated if it is destroyed, allowing the KLM CNOT to be used in long-running quantum computations without risking the rest of the computation. Additionally, gate teleportation is a key component of magic state distillation, a technique that can be used to overcome the limitations of the Eastin-Knill theorem.

Quantum gate teleportation has been demonstrated in various types of quantum computers, including linear optical, superconducting quantum computing, and trapped ion quantum computing.
