= Andrew Steane =

British physicist (born 1965)

- Born: 1965 (age 60–61); Bath, Somerset, UK
- Education: University of Oxford
- Known for: Steane code
- Awards: Maxwell Medal and Prize, 2000
- Scientific career
- Fields: Physics
- Workplaces: University of Oxford

Andrew Martin Steane is Professor of physics at the University of Oxford. He is also a fellow of Exeter College, Oxford.

He was a student at St Edmund Hall, Oxford where he obtained his MA and DPhil.

His major works to date are on error correction in quantum information processing, including Steane codes. He was awarded the Maxwell Medal and Prize of the Institute of Physics in 2000.

== Papers ==
- "Quantum Computing" Reports on Progress in Physics 61: 117–173. Steane, A.M. (1998)
- "A Quantum Computer Needs Only One Universe" Studies in History and Philosophy of Modern Physics 34B: 469–478, Steane, A.M. (2003)

== Books ==
- The Wonderful World of Relativity: A Precise Guide for the General Reader. Oxford U. Press. 2011. ISBN 978-0-19-969461-7.
- Relativity Made Relatively Easy. Oxford University Press. 2012.

'Relativity Made Relatively Easy' is a text that follows closely to the 'Symmetry and Relativity' course that he teaches to third-year undergraduates at the University of Oxford. Except for Spinors, which is intended to be included in his next publication.

- Faithful to Science: The Role of Science in Religion. Oxford University Press. 2014.
- Thermodynamics by Andrew Steane
