= Physical and logical qubits =

Types of quantum information

In quantum computing, a qubit is a unit of information analogous to a bit (binary digit) in classical computing, but it is affected by quantum mechanical properties such as superposition and entanglement which allow qubits to be in some ways more powerful than classical bits for some tasks. Qubits are used in quantum circuits and quantum algorithms composed of quantum logic gates to solve computational problems, where they are used for input/output and intermediate computations.

A physical qubit is a physical device that behaves as a two-state quantum system, used as a component of a computer system. A logical qubit is a physical or abstract qubit that performs as specified in a quantum algorithm or quantum circuit subject to unitary transformations, has a long enough coherence time to be usable by quantum logic gates (cf. propagation delay for classical logic gates).

Since the development of the first quantum computer in 1998, most technologies used to implement qubits face issues of stability, decoherence, fault tolerance and scalability. Because of this, many physical qubits are needed for the purposes of error-correction to produce an entity which behaves logically as a single qubit would in a quantum circuit or algorithm; this is the subject of quantum error correction. Thus, contemporary logical qubits typically consist of many physical qubits to provide stability, error-correction and fault tolerance needed to perform useful computations.

In 2023, Google researchers showed how quantum error correction can improve logical qubit performance by increasing the physical qubit count. These results found that a larger logical qubit (49 physical qubits) had a lower error rate, about 2.9 percent per round of error correction, compared to a rate of about 3.0 percent for the smaller logical qubit (17 physical qubits).

In 2024, IBM researchers created a quantum error correction code 10 times more efficient than previous research, protecting 12 logical qubits for roughly a million cycles of error checks using 288 qubits. The work demonstrates error correction on near-term devices while reducing overhead – the number of physical qubits required to keep errors low.

In 2024, Microsoft and Quantinuum announced experimental results that showed logical qubits could be created with significantly fewer physical qubits. The team used quantum error correction techniques developed by Microsoft and Quantinuum's trapped ion hardware to use 30 physical qubits to form four logical qubits. Scientists used a qubit virtualization system and active syndrome extraction—also called repeated error correction to accomplish this. This work defines how to achieve logical qubits within quantum computation.

== Overview ==
1-bit and 2-bit quantum gate operations have been shown to be universal. A quantum algorithm can be instantiated as a quantum circuit.

A logical qubit specifies how a single qubit should behave in a quantum algorithm, subject to quantum logic operations which can be built out of quantum logic gates. However, issues in current technologies preclude single two-state quantum systems, which can be used as physical qubits, from reliably encoding and retaining this information for long enough to be useful. Therefore, current attempts to produce scalable quantum computers require quantum error correction, and multiple (currently many) physical qubits must be used to create a single, error-tolerant logical qubit. Depending on the error-correction scheme used, and the error rates of each physical qubit, a single logical qubit could be formed of up to 1,000 physical qubits.

== Topological quantum computing ==
The approach of topological qubits, which takes advantage of topological effects in quantum mechanics, has been proposed as needing many fewer or even a single physical qubit per logical qubit. Topological qubits rely on a class of particles called anyons which have spin that is neither half-integral (fermions) nor integral (bosons), and therefore obey neither the Fermi–Dirac statistics nor the Bose–Einstein statistics of particle behavior. Anyons exhibit braid symmetry in their world lines, which has desirable properties for the stability of qubits. Notably, anyons must exist in systems constrained to two spatial dimensions or fewer, according to the spin–statistics theorem, which states that in 3 or more spatial dimensions, only fermions and bosons are possible. In 2025, researchers made progress in topological quantum computing by successfully measuring the state of special particles called Majorana zero modes in a single step.

== See also ==
- Quantum error correction and the quantum threshold theorem
- Quantum computing § Obstacles
- Superconductive quantum computing
  - Josephson junction
- Trapped-ion quantum computing
- Semiconductor-based quantum computing
  - Quantum dot
- Topological quantum computing
