= Steane code =

Code for quantum correction

The Steane code is a tool in quantum error correction introduced by Andrew Steane in 1996. It is a CSS code (Calderbank-Shor-Steane), using the classical binary [7,4,3] Hamming code to correct for both qubit flip errors (X errors) and phase flip errors (Z errors). The Steane code encodes one logical qubit in 7 physical qubits and is able to correct arbitrary single qubit errors.

Its check matrix in standard form is

$$\begin{bmatrix}
H & 0 \\
0 & H
\end{bmatrix}$$

where H is the parity-check matrix of the Hamming code and is given by

$$H =   \begin{bmatrix}
1 & 0 & 0 & 1 & 0 & 1 & 1\\
0 & 1 & 0 & 1 & 1 & 0 & 1\\
0 & 0 & 1 & 0 & 1 & 1 & 1
\end{bmatrix}.$$

The $[[7,1,3]]$ Steane code is the first in the family of quantum Hamming codes, codes with parameters $[[2^r-1, 2^r-1-2r, 3]]$ for integers $r \geq 3$. It is also a quantum color code.

== Expression in the stabilizer formalism ==
In a quantum error-correcting code, the codespace is the subspace of the overall Hilbert space where all logical states live. In an $n$-qubit stabilizer code, we can describe this subspace by its Pauli stabilizing group, the set of all $n$-qubit Pauli operators which stabilize every logical state. The stabilizer formalism allows us to define the codespace of a stabilizer code by specifying its Pauli stabilizing group. We can efficiently describe this exponentially large group by listing its generators.

Since the Steane code encodes one logical qubit in 7 physical qubits, the codespace for the Steane code is a $2$-dimensional subspace of its $2^7$-dimensional Hilbert space.

In the stabilizer formalism, the Steane code has 6 generators:

$$\begin{align}
& IIIXXXX \\
& IXXIIXX \\
& XIXIXIX \\
& IIIZZZZ \\
& IZZIIZZ \\
& ZIZIZIZ.
\end{align}$$

Note that each of the above generators is the tensor product of 7 single-qubit Pauli operations. For instance, $IIIXXXX$ is just shorthand for $I \otimes I \otimes I \otimes X \otimes X \otimes X \otimes X$, that is, an identity on the first three qubits and an $X$ gate on each of the last four qubits. The tensor products are often omitted in notation for brevity.

The logical $X$ and $Z$ gates are

$$\begin{align}
X_L & = XXXXXXX \\
Z_L & = ZZZZZZZ.
\end{align}$$

The logical $| 0 \rangle$ and $| 1 \rangle$ states of the Steane code are

$$\begin{align}
| 0 \rangle_L = & \frac{1}{\sqrt{8}} [ | 0000000 \rangle + | 1010101 \rangle + | 0110011 \rangle + | 1100110 \rangle \\
& + | 0001111 \rangle + | 1011010 \rangle + | 0111100 \rangle + | 1101001 \rangle ] \\
| 1 \rangle_L = & X_L | 0 \rangle_L.
\end{align}$$

Arbitrary codestates are of the form $| \psi \rangle = \alpha | 0 \rangle_L + \beta | 1 \rangle_L$.
