= Peter Shor =

American mathematician

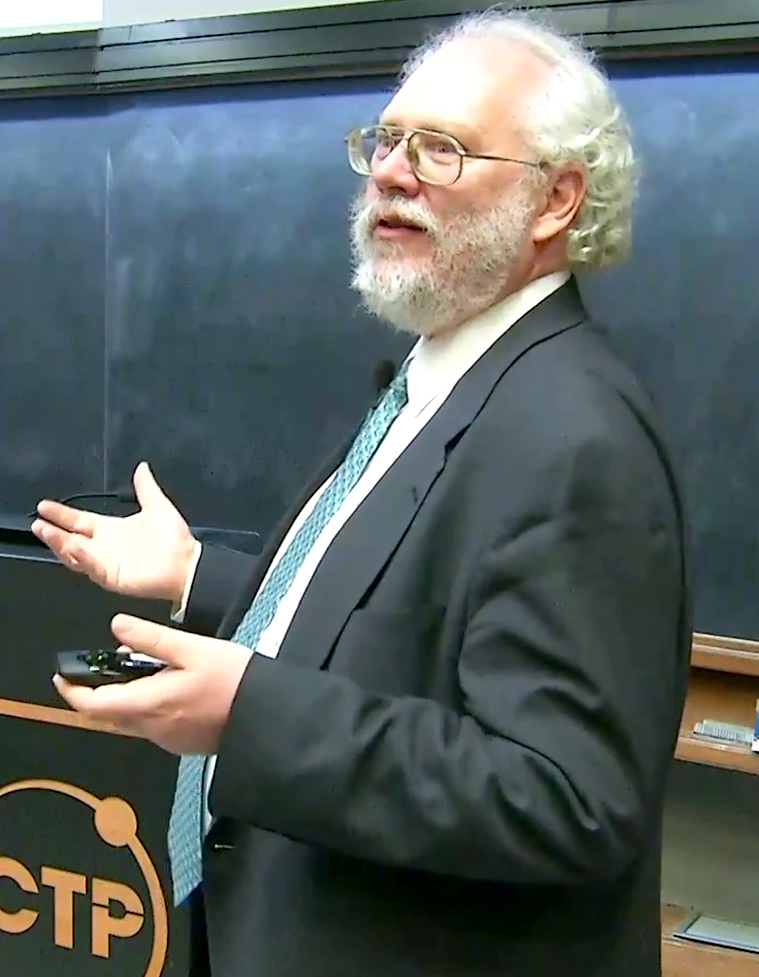
- Shor in 2018
- Born: August 14, 1959 (age 67); New York City, U.S.
- Education: California Institute of Technology (BS); Massachusetts Institute of Technology (PhD)
- Known for: Shor's algorithm Shor code CSS code SMAWK algorithm Stabilizer code Quantum threshold theorem
- Awards: Putnam Fellow (1978); Nevanlinna Prize (1998); MacArthur Fellowship (July 1999); Gödel Prize (1999); King Faisal International Prize (2002); ICS Prize (2007); Dirac Medal (2017) of ICTP; Micius Quantum Prize (2018); IEEE Eric E. Sumner Award (2018) BBVA Foundation Frontiers of Knowledge Award (2019); Lise Meitner Distinguished Lecture and Medal, (2022); Breakthrough Prize in Fundamental Physics (2023); Claude E. Shannon Award (2025)
- Scientific career
- Fields: Computer science, applied mathematics
- Workplaces: Massachusetts Institute of Technology; Bell Labs; University of California, Berkeley
- Thesis: Random planar matching and bin packing (1985)
- Doctoral advisor: Tom Leighton

Peter Williston Shor (born August 14, 1959) is an American theoretical computer scientist known for his work on quantum computation, in particular for devising Shor's algorithm, a quantum algorithm for factoring exponentially faster than the best currently-known algorithm running on a classical computer. He has been a professor of applied mathematics at the Massachusetts Institute of Technology (MIT) since 2003.

== Early life and education ==
Shor was born on August 14, 1959, in New York City, to Joan Bopp Shor and S. W. Williston Shor. He grew up in Washington, D.C. and Mill Valley, California. While attending Tamalpais High School, he placed third in the 1977 USA Mathematical Olympiad. After graduation that year, he won a silver medal at the International Math Olympiad in Yugoslavia (the U.S. team achieved the most points per country that year).

Shor graduated from the California Institute of Technology (Caltech) in 1981 with a B.S. in mathematics. He was a Putnam Fellow in 1978. He then did doctoral study in applied mathematics at MIT, receiving a Ph.D. in 1985. His doctoral advisor was F. Thomson Leighton, and his thesis was on probabilistic analysis of bin-packing algorithms.

== Career ==
After being awarded his PhD by MIT, he spent one year as a postdoctoral researcher at the University of California, Berkeley, and then accepted a position at Bell Labs in New Providence, New Jersey. It was there that he developed Shor's algorithm. This development was inspired by Simon's problem. Shor first found an efficient quantum algorithm for the discrete log problem (which relates point-finding on a hypercube to a torus) and,

"Later that week, I was able to solve the factoring problem as well. There’s a strange relation between discrete log and factoring."

Both of these problems are examples of the HSP. For his work discovering the efficient quantum algorithms for factoring and discrete logarithm he was awarded the Nevanlinna Prize at the 23rd International Congress of Mathematicians in 1998 and the Gödel Prize in 1999. In 1999, he was awarded a MacArthur Fellowship. In 2017, he received the Dirac Medal of the ICTP and for 2019 the BBVA Foundation Frontiers of Knowledge Award in Basic Sciences.

Shor began his MIT position in 2003. Currently, he is the Henry Adams Morss and Henry Adams Morss, Jr. Professor of Applied Mathematics in the Department of Mathematics at MIT. He also is affiliated with CSAIL.

He received a Distinguished Alumni Award from Caltech in 2007.

On October 1, 2011, he was inducted into the American Academy of Arts and Sciences. He was elected as an ACM Fellow in 2019 "for contributions to quantum-computing, information theory, and randomized algorithms". He was elected as a member of the National Academy of Sciences in 2002. In 2020, he was elected a member of the National Academy of Engineering for pioneering contributions to quantum computation.

In an interview published in Nature on October 30, 2020, Shor said that he considers post-quantum cryptography to be a solution to the quantum threat, although a lot of engineering effort is required to switch from vulnerable algorithms.

Along with three others, Shor was awarded the 2023 Breakthrough Prize in Fundamental Physics for "foundational work in the field of quantum information."

== Personal life ==
Through his father, S. W. Williston Shor, he is a descendant of Samuel Wendell Williston.

== See also ==
- Entanglement-assisted classical capacity
- Keller's conjecture
- Stabilizer code
- Quantum capacity
