= Qutrit =

Unit of quantum information

A qutrit (or quantum trit) is a unit of quantum information that is realized by a 3-level quantum system (qudit with radix 3), that may be in a superposition of three mutually orthogonal quantum states.

The qutrit is analogous to the classical radix-3 trit, just as the qubit, a quantum system described by a superposition of two orthogonal states, is analogous to the classical radix-2 bit.

There is ongoing work to develop quantum computers using qutrits and qudits in general.

== Representation ==
A qutrit has three orthonormal basis states or vectors, often denoted $|0\rangle$, $|1\rangle$, and $|2\rangle$ in Dirac or bra–ket notation. These are used to describe the qutrit as a superposition state vector in the form of a linear combination of the three orthonormal basis states:

$$|\psi\rangle = \alpha |0\rangle + \beta |1\rangle + \gamma |2\rangle$$,

where the coefficients are complex probability amplitudes, such that the sum of their squares is unity (normalization):

$$|\alpha |^2 + |\beta |^2 + |\gamma |^2=1 \,$$

The qubit's orthonormal basis states $\{ |0\rangle, |1\rangle\}$ span the two-dimensional complex Hilbert space $H_2$, corresponding to spin-up and spin-down of a spin-1/2 particle. Qutrits require a Hilbert space of higher dimension, namely the three-dimensional $H_3$ spanned by the qutrit's basis $\{ |0\rangle, |1\rangle, |2\rangle\}$, which can be realized by a three-level quantum system.

An n-qutrit register can represent 3^{n} different states simultaneously, i.e., a superposition state vector in 3^{n}-dimensional complex Hilbert space.

Qutrits have several peculiar features when used for storing quantum information. For example, they are more robust to decoherence under certain environmental interactions. In reality, manipulating qutrits directly might be tricky, and one way to do that is by using an entanglement with a qubit.

== Qutrit quantum gates ==
The quantum logic gates operating on single qutrits are $3 \times 3$ unitary matrices and gates that act on registers of $n$ qutrits are $3^n \times 3^n$ unitary matrices (the elements of the unitary groups U(3) and U(3^{n}) respectively).

The rotation operator gates (Note: This can be compared with the three rotation operator gates for qubits. We get eight linearly independent rotation operators by selecting appropriate $\Theta$. For example, we get the 1st rotation operator for SU(3) by setting $\Theta_1 \ne 0$ and all others to zero.) for SU(3) are $\operatorname{Rot}(\Theta_1, \Theta_2, \dots, \Theta_8) = \exp \left( -i\sum_{a=1}^8 \Theta_a \frac{\lambda_a}{2} \right)$, where $\lambda_a$ is the a'th Gell-Mann matrix, and $\Theta_a$ is a real value. The Lie algebra of the matrix exponential is provided here. The same rotation operators are used for gluon interactions, where the three basis states are the three colors ($|0\rangle = \text{red}, |1\rangle = \text{green}, |2\rangle = \text{blue}$) of the strong interaction. (Note: Note: $U(3)=U(1) \oplus SU(3).$ Quarks and gluons have color charge interactions in SU(3), not U(3), meaning there are no pure phase shift rotations allowed for gluons. If such rotations were allowed, it would mean that there would be a 9th gluon.)

The global phase shift gate for the qutrit (Note: Comparable with the global phase shift gate for qubits.) is
$$\operatorname{Ph}(\delta) = \begin{bmatrix} e^{i\delta} & 0 & 0 \\ 0 & e^{i\delta} & 0 \\ 0 & 0 & e^{i\delta} \end{bmatrix} = \exp \left( i\delta I \right) = e^{i\delta}I$$
where the phase factor $e^{i\delta}$ is called the global phase.

This phase gate performs the mapping $|\Psi\rangle \mapsto e^{i\delta} |\Psi\rangle$ and together with the 8 rotation operators is capable of expressing any single-qutrit gate in U(3), as a series circuit of at most 9 gates.

== Error corrected ternary quantum computing ==
Fault-tolerant implementation of a specific qutrit gate can be more or less challenging, depending on its place in the so-called Clifford hierarchy.

Let $\omega=e^{2\pi i/3}$ be the third root of unity. Consider the subgroup $P_3$ of ternary Pauli gates with two generators $X = |1\rangle \langle 0 |+ |2\rangle \langle 1 |+ |0\rangle \langle 2 |$ and $Z = |0\rangle \langle 0 |+\omega |1\rangle \langle 1 |+\omega^2 |2\rangle \langle 2 |$. Operators in the Pauli subgroup are in general the least expensive to implement. The multi-qutrit Pauli subgroup consists of arbitrary tensor products of single-qutrit Pauli operators.

A significantly larger group of Clifford gates consists of all the gates that stabilize the Pauli subgroup. As shown in, the following gates can be chosen as generators of the Clifford group:
$$\operatorname{H} = \frac{1}{\omega^2-\omega}\begin{bmatrix} 1 & 1 & 1 \\ 1 & \omega & \omega^2 \\ 1 & \omega^2 & \omega \end{bmatrix}$$

$S = \omega |0\rangle \langle 0 |+\omega^2 |1\rangle \langle 1 |+ |2\rangle \langle 2 |$ and $CZ = \text{diag}(1,1,1,1,\omega,\omega^2,1,\omega^2,\omega)$

For any fixed set of qutrits the Clifford group is finite and therefore is not sufficient for universal quantum computation. Adding one single non-Clifford gate to a set of its generators, however, ensures quantum universality, but requires resource-consuming techniques such as magic state distillation.

Arguably, the simplest non-Clifford gate to consider is $T = |0\rangle \langle 0 |+ |1\rangle \langle 1 |+ \sqrt\omega |2\rangle \langle 2 |$. Injecting $T$ as a new generator is equivalent to being able to prepare the quantum ("magic") state $\hat{T} = |0\rangle + |1\rangle+\sqrt \omega |2\rangle$ from a standard qutrit basis state. This, however, cannot be done perfectly using qutrit Clifford group alone (because e.g.$\sqrt \omega$ does not belong to the $\mathbb{Q}(\omega)$ numeric field).

== See also ==
- Gell-Mann matrices
- Generalizations of Pauli matrices
- Mutually unbiased bases
- Quantum computing
- Radix economy
- Ternary computing
