= Magic (quantum information) =

Property of computational resources needed

- Field: Quantum information science
- Related states: Magic state, Stabilizer state
- Core concept: Non-stabilizer resource
- Key application: Universal quantum computation
- Established by: Sergey Bravyi and Alexei Kitaev (2005)
- Associated theorem: Gottesman–Knill theorem

In quantum information theory, magic is a property that quantifies the computational resources needed to describe quantum states beyond stabilizer states, which can be efficiently simulated on classical computers. The concept emerged from the Gottesman-Knill theorem proven in the 1990s, which showed that highly entangled stabilizer states offer no quantum computational advantage because they can be simulated just as efficiently on classical computers. In 2014, it was found that magic states are connected to contextuality: in quantum mechanics, it shows that measurement outcomes depend on what other properties are simultaneously measured. Magic is commonly measured using the stabilizer Rényi entropy, which can be experimentally determined through randomized measurement protocols on quantum processors. Without magic, quantum computers cannot perform any computation that classical computers cannot already do, making it essential for achieving quantum computational advantage.

In 2024–2025, quantum magic was detected in top quark pairs produced at the Large Hadron Collider; it is the first observation of this property in fundamental particle collisions. The CMS and ATLAS experiments measured correlations between entangled top and anti-top quarks, with the amount of magic depending on the quarks' velocity and direction of travel. Recent theoretical work has revealed a computational phase separation between entanglement-dominated states, where entanglement tasks can be performed efficiently, and magic-dominated states, where such tasks become computationally intractable. Experimental measurements on IBM quantum processors have demonstrated that imperfectly implemented Clifford gates can inject unwanted magic into quantum circuits, and that decoherence affects magic in complex ways, either increasing or decreasing it. The problem of finding quantum states with maximal magic has been shown to be connected to the 25-year-old mathematical problem of the existence of symmetric informationally complete measurements.

Xhek Turkeshi describes how magic states can be visualized:

Physically, magic can be pictured as an “extra twist” in a quantum state’s geometry—that is, a feature that prevents the state from being mapped, through simple transformations, into a configuration that a classical computer could track efficiently. In single-qubit systems, magic can be visualized as a departure from certain discrete points on the Bloch sphere that represent stabilizer states. In many-body systems, however, this geometric intuition quickly fails.

== Magic and emergent gravity ==
Recent theoretical work has suggested that magic may also play a role in models of quantum gravity and holography. In holographic quantum error-correcting codes, stabilizer-code models reproduce some qualitative features of the Ryu–Takayanagi conjecture but they are too rigid to describe state-dependent geometry or gravitational backreaction. A 2024 result showed that stabilizer codes cannot support non-trivial area operators, suggesting that non-local magic is required for code models that aim to reproduce features of gravitational backreaction and the quantum extremal surface formula.

Further work connected non-local magic more directly to gravitational backreaction. In conformal field theories with holographic duals, the strength of gravitational backreaction has been related to non-local magic in the boundary quantum state. In approximate holographic quantum codes, magic-enriched perturbations can make the area-like contribution to entropy depend on the bulk state, producing behavior analogous to matter-geometry coupling in the quantum extremal surface prescription. These results suggest that non-local magic may be a resource not only for quantum computational advantage, but also for modeling aspects of emergent spacetime geometry.

== See also ==
- Magic state distillation
- Gottesman–Knill theorem
- Quantum error correction
- Holographic principle
- Ryu–Takayanagi conjecture
