= Continuous-variable quantum information =

Continuous (non-quantized) quantities in quantum information science

Continuous-variable (CV) quantum information is the area of quantum information science that makes use of physical observables, like the strength of an electromagnetic field, whose numerical values belong to continuous intervals. One primary application is quantum computing. In a sense, continuous-variable quantum computation is "analog", while quantum computation using qubits is "digital." In more technical terms, the former makes use of Hilbert spaces that are infinite-dimensional, while the Hilbert spaces for systems comprising collections of qubits are finite-dimensional. One motivation for studying continuous-variable quantum computation is to understand what resources are necessary to make quantum computers more powerful than classical ones.

== Implementation ==
One approach to implementing continuous-variable quantum information protocols in the laboratory is through the techniques of quantum optics. By modeling each mode of the electromagnetic field as a quantum harmonic oscillator with its associated creation and annihilation operators, one defines a canonically conjugate pair of variables for each mode, the so-called "quadratures", which play the role of position and momentum observables. These observables establish a phase space on which Wigner quasiprobability distributions can be defined. Quantum measurements on such a system can be performed using homodyne and heterodyne detectors.

Quantum teleportation of continuous-variable quantum information was achieved by optical methods in 1998. (Science deemed this experiment one of the "top 10" advances of the year.) In 2013, quantum-optics techniques were used to create a "cluster state", a type of preparation essential to one-way (measurement-based) quantum computation, involving over 10,000 entangled temporal modes, available two at a time. In another implementation, 60 modes were simultaneously entangled in the frequency domain, in the optical frequency comb of an optical parametric oscillator.

Another proposal is to modify the ion-trap quantum computer: instead of storing a single qubit in the internal energy levels of an ion, one could in principle use the position and momentum of the ion as continuous quantum variables.

== Applications ==
Continuous-variable quantum systems can be used for quantum cryptography, and in particular, quantum key distribution. Quantum computing is another potential application, and a variety of approaches have been considered. The first method, proposed by Seth Lloyd and Samuel L. Braunstein in 1999, was in the tradition of the circuit model: quantum logic gates are created by Hamiltonians that, in this case, are quadratic functions of the harmonic-oscillator quadratures. Later, measurement-based quantum computation was adapted to the setting of infinite-dimensional Hilbert spaces. Yet a third model of continuous-variable quantum computation encodes finite-dimensional systems (collections of qubits) into infinite-dimensional ones. This model is due to Daniel Gottesman, Alexei Kitaev and John Preskill who introduced the Gottesman–Kitaev–Preskill code.

== Classical emulation ==
In all approaches to quantum computing, it is important to know whether a task under consideration can be carried out efficiently by a classical computer. An algorithm might be described in the language of quantum mechanics, but upon closer analysis, revealed to be implementable using only classical resources. Such an algorithm would not be taking full advantage of the extra possibilities made available by quantum physics. In the theory of quantum computation using finite-dimensional Hilbert spaces, the Gottesman–Knill theorem demonstrates that there exists a set of quantum processes that can be emulated efficiently on a classical computer. Generalizing this theorem to the continuous-variable case, it can be shown that, likewise, a class of continuous-variable quantum computations can be simulated using only classical analog computations. This class includes, in fact, some computational tasks that use quantum entanglement. When the Wigner quasiprobability representations of all the quantities—states, time evolutions and measurements—involved in a computation are nonnegative, then they can be interpreted as ordinary probability distributions, indicating that the computation can be modeled as an essentially classical one. This type of construction can be thought of as a continuum generalization of the Spekkens toy model.

== Computing continuous functions with discrete quantum systems ==
Occasionally, and somewhat confusingly, the term "continuous quantum computation" is used to refer to a different area of quantum computing: the study of how to use quantum systems having finite-dimensional Hilbert spaces to calculate or approximate the answers to mathematical questions involving continuous functions. A major motivation for investigating the quantum computation of continuous functions is that many scientific problems have mathematical formulations in terms of continuous quantities. A second motivation is to explore and understand the ways in which quantum computers can be more capable or powerful than classical ones. The computational complexity of a problem can be quantified in terms of the minimal computational resources necessary to solve it. In quantum computing, resources include the number of qubits available to a computer and the number of queries that can be made to that computer. The classical complexity of many continuous problems is known. Therefore, when the quantum complexity of these problems is obtained, the question as to whether quantum computers are more powerful than classical can be answered. Furthermore, the degree of the improvement can be quantified. In contrast, the complexity of discrete problems is typically unknown. For example, the classical complexity of integer factorization is unknown.

One example of a scientific problem that is naturally expressed in continuous terms is path integration. The general technique of path integration has numerous applications including quantum mechanics, quantum chemistry, statistical mechanics, and computational finance. Because randomness is present throughout quantum theory, one typically requires that a quantum computational procedure yield the correct answer, not with certainty, but with high probability. For example, one might aim for a procedure that computes the correct answer with probability at least 3/4. One also specifies a degree of uncertainty, typically by setting the maximum acceptable error. Thus, the goal of a quantum computation could be to compute the numerical result of a path-integration problem to within an error of at most ε with probability 3/4 or more. In this context, it is known that quantum algorithms can outperform their classical counterparts, and the computational complexity of path integration, as measured by the number of times one would expect to have to query a quantum computer to get a good answer, grows as the inverse of ε.

Other continuous problems for which quantum algorithms have been studied include finding matrix eigenvalues, phase estimation, the Sturm–Liouville eigenvalue problem, solving differential equations with the Feynman–Kac formula, initial value problems, function approximation, high-dimensional integration and quantum cryptography.

== See also ==
- Quantum inequalities
