= Dmitri Maslov =

Computer scientist

Dmitri Aleksandrovich Maslov
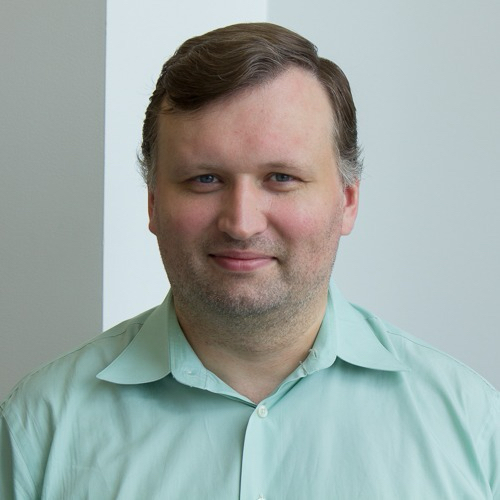
- Born: April 2, 1977 (age 49)
- Education: University of New Brunswick, Moscow State University
- Scientific career
- Fields: Computer Science, Electrical Engineering, Optimization, Electronic Design Automation, Quantum Computing
- Workplaces: National Science Foundation, University of Maryland, IBM
- Thesis: Reversible Logic Synthesis (2003)
- Doctoral advisor: Gerhard W. Dueck

Dmitri Aleksandrovich Maslov (born April 2, 1977) is a Canadian-American computer scientist renowned for contributions to quantum circuit synthesis, optimization, and benchmarking. He has held senior research and leadership roles at IBM Quantum, the U.S. National Science Foundation, and (since July 2024) Google Quantum AI.” In 2021, he was named a Fellow of the Institute of Electrical and Electronics Engineers.

== Biography ==
Maslov was born on April 2, 1977. He earned an M.Sc. in mathematics from Moscow State University, Russia in 2000 and completed M.Sc. and Ph.D. degrees in computer science at the University of New Brunswick, Canada in 2003.

== Career ==
=== Early career ===
Following completion of his doctorate, Maslov held various postdoctoral fellow positions between 2003 and 2008, including those at the University of Victoria and the University of Waterloo's Institute for Quantum Computing (IQC). From 2008 to 2010, he served as Research Assistant Professor at IQC/UWaterloo in the Department of Physics and Astronomy, followed by an Adjunct Professor position from 2010 to 2013. From 2015 to 2016, he was a visiting fellow at the Joint Center for Quantum Information and Computer Science at the University of Maryland.

=== Senior appointments ===
From 2008 to 2018, Maslov was a Program Director with the Division of Computing and Communication Foundations and the Directorate for Computer and Information Science and Engineering, National Science Foundation, where he managed multi-million-dollar awards and helped launch the “Connections in Quantum Information Science” meta-program. From January 2019 to July 2024, Maslov served as Chief Software Architect at IBM Quantum, leading development of compilers, simulators, and verification tools for superconducting and trapped-ion architectures. In this role, he provided technical leadership and direction for the development of the software stack for quantum computers, while simultaneously conducting research in quantum compilation, quantum circuit design and optimization, quantum advantage, and quantum computer architectures.

In 2024, Maslov joined Google (Quantum Artificial Intelligence Lab), where he performs research in quantum computing and co-maintains the open-source software for Q#-compatible and OpenQASM compilers integrated into Google Quantum AI’s Cirq framework, enabling widespread access to advanced optimization algorithms in open-source quantum software libraries.

== Research contributions ==
Maslov’s work spans theoretical and practical aspects of quantum‐circuit design, compilation, and optimization. Key contributions include:

- Reversible circuit synthesis - Developed algorithms for synthesizing reversible Boolean functions using minimal numbers of Toffoli and CNOT gates, or alternatively circuit cost metrics (along with appropriate gate‐count lower bounds). These include a highly-cited simple, efficient, and high-performing MMD algorithm for reversible logic synthesis. Maslov's 2007 framework for optimized reversible circuit synthesis reduced gate counts by up to 40% compared to prior methods.
- Frameworks for reversible and quantum circuit optimization - Introduced and developed two variants of the templates optimization technique for classes of circuits of interest, as well as phase polynomial framework for quantum circuit optimization, now considered standard in the field.
- Clifford and Clifford+T circuit synthesis - Obtained multiple results on the synthesis and optimization of circuits with Clifford gates, including short layered decomposition of the form -X-Z-P-CX-CZ-H-CZ-H-P, exact (in the number of the degrees of freedom) parametrization of Clifford group elements by quantum circuits, and computational advantage by Clifford circuits over classical reversible CNOT circuits. Developed optimal synthesis of Z-angle rotations over Clifford+T gate library. Introduced techniques for minimizing the number of expensive T gates in Clifford+T circuits, including heuristics that exploit ancilla qubits and parallelization to reduce T-depth. His 2014 phase polynomial method achieved T-count reductions up to 50% on standard benchmarks.
- Physical-level quantum compilation - Developed optimized implementations of basic quantum gates and a compiling protocol for an ion trap quantum computer equipped with control by two-qubit and single-qubit pulses, parallel entangling gates, as well implementations of foundational computational primitives such as multiply-controlled Toffoli gates, quantum Fourier transform, and elements of the Clifford group using a small number of global Molmer-Sorensen gates.
- Synthesis and optimization for common operations and subcircuits - Developed depth optimal quantum circuit synthesis method for frequently used quantum logical operations. Described optimization of multiple-control Toffoli-gate implementation using relative-phase Toffoli gates
- Estimation and benchmarking of quantum advantage - Led development of quantum-vs-classical benchmarking protocols, including the first resource-estimation study for demonstrating quantum advantage in space-limited scenarios, establishing benchmarks for near-term quantum devices.
- Low-overhead, fault-tolerant memory - Contributed to the design of bicycle bivariate quantum LDPC codes with the error threshold comparable to the industry-standard surface code yet a 10x reduction in the physical qubit count, leading to a high-threshold low-overhead fault-tolerant quantum memory.

== Awards and recognition ==
In 2021, Maslov was named a Fellow of the Institute of Electrical and Electronics Engineers "for contributions to quantum circuit synthesis and optimization, and compiling for quantum computers". He has been recognized as an Outstanding Reviewer for Quantum Science and Technology journal.

Maslov's research work indexed by Google Scholar shows over 12,500 citations and h-index of 51.
