= Graph state =

Concept in quantum computing

In quantum computing, a graph state is a special type of multi-qubit state that can be represented by a graph. Each qubit is represented by a vertex of the graph, and there is an edge between every interacting pair of qubits. In particular, they are a convenient way of representing certain types of entangled states.

Graph states are useful in quantum error-correcting codes, entanglement measurement and purification and for characterization of computational resources in measurement based quantum computing models. A graph state is a particular case of a stabilizer state as well as a 2-uniform hypergraph state, a generalization where the edges have cardinality between 1 and N.

== Formal definition ==
Quantum graph states can be defined in two equivalent ways: through the notion of quantum circuits and stabilizer formalism.

=== Quantum circuit definition ===
Given a graph $G = (V, E)$, with the set of vertices $V$ and the set of edges $E$, the corresponding graph state is defined as

$${\left| G \right\rangle} =\prod _{(a,b)\in E}U^{\{ a,b\} } {\left| + \right\rangle} ^{\otimes |V|}$$

where ${\left| + \right\rangle} = \frac{1}{\sqrt{2}}({\left| 0 \right\rangle} +{\left| 1 \right\rangle} )$ and the operator $U^{\{ a,b\} }$ is the controlled-Z interaction between the two vertices (corresponding to two qubits) $a$ and $b$

$$U^{\{ a,b\} } =\left[\begin{array}{cccc} {1} & {0} & {0} & {0} \\ {0} & {1} & {0} & {0} \\ {0} & {0} & {1} & {0} \\ {0} & {0} & {0} & {-1} \end{array}\right]$$

=== Stabilizer formalism definition ===
An alternative and equivalent definition is the following, which makes use of the stabilizer formalism.

Define an operator $S_v$ for each vertex $v$ of $G$:

$$S_v =\sigma _{x}^{(v)} \prod _{u \in N(v)} \sigma _{z}^{(u)}$$

where $\sigma _{x,y,z}$ are the Pauli matrices and $N(v)$ is the set of vertices adjacent to $v$. The $S_v$ operators commute. The graph state ${\left| G \right\rangle}$ is defined as the simultaneous $+1$-eigenvalue eigenstate of the $\left|V\right|$ operators $\left\{S_v \right\}_{v \in V}$:

$$S_v {\left| G \right\rangle} = {\left| G \right\rangle}$$

and thus every graph state is a stabilizer state.

=== Equivalence between the two definitions ===
A proof of the equivalence of the two definitions can be found in.

== Examples ==
- If $G = P_3$ is a three-vertex path, then the $S_v$ stabilizers are

$$\begin{align}
\sigma_x \otimes {}&\sigma_z \otimes I, \\
\sigma_z \otimes {}&\sigma_x \otimes \sigma_z, \\
I \otimes {}&\sigma_z \otimes \sigma_x
\end{align}$$

The corresponding quantum state is

$${\left| P_3 \right\rangle} = \frac{1}{\sqrt{8}}(
{\left| 000 \right\rangle}
+ {\left| 100 \right\rangle}
+ {\left| 010 \right\rangle}
- {\left| 110 \right\rangle}
+ {\left| 001 \right\rangle}
+ {\left| 101 \right\rangle}
- {\left| 011 \right\rangle}
+ {\left| 111 \right\rangle}
)$$

- If $G = K_3$ is a triangle on three vertices, then the $S_v$ stabilizers are

$$\begin{align}
\sigma_x \otimes {}&\sigma_z \otimes \sigma_z, \\
\sigma_z \otimes {}&\sigma_x \otimes \sigma_z, \\
\sigma_z \otimes {}&\sigma_z \otimes \sigma_x
\end{align}$$

The corresponding quantum state is

$${\left| K_3 \right\rangle} = \frac{1}{\sqrt{8}}(
{\left| 000 \right\rangle}
+ {\left| 100 \right\rangle}
+ {\left| 010 \right\rangle}
- {\left| 110 \right\rangle}
+ {\left| 001 \right\rangle}
- {\left| 101 \right\rangle}
- {\left| 011 \right\rangle}
- {\left| 111 \right\rangle}
)$$

Observe that ${\left| P_3 \right\rangle}$ and ${\left| K_3 \right\rangle}$ are locally equivalent to each other, i.e., can be mapped to each other by applying one-qubit unitary transformations. Indeed, switching $\sigma_x$ and $\sigma_y$ on the first and last qubits, while switching $\sigma_y$ and $\sigma_z$ on the middle qubit, maps the stabilizer group of one into that of the other.

== Local Equivalence ==
Two graph states are called locally equivalent if one can be converted into the other by local unitary gates. If the conversion from one state to the other can be performed by local gates from the Clifford group, the two states are called locally Clifford equivalent. If and only if two graph states are locally Clifford equivalent, one graph can be converted into the other by a sequence of so-called "local complementations". This gives a useful tool for studying local Clifford equivalence by a simple graph-manipulation rule and corresponding equivalence classes of graph states have been studied in Refs. However, local Clifford equivalence of graph states only coincides with local unitary equivalence for small graph states and is generally not identical.

== Entanglement criteria and Bell inequalities for graph states ==
After a graph state was created in an experiment, it is important to verify that indeed, an entangled quantum state has been created. The fidelity with respect to a $N$-qubit graph state $|G_N\rangle$ is given by

$F_{GN}={\rm Tr}(\rho |G_N\rangle\langle G_N|),$

It has been shown that if $F_{GN}>1/2$ for a nontrivial graph state corresponding to a connected graph, then the state $\rho$ has genuine multiparticle entanglement. Thus, one can obtain an entanglement witness detecting entanglement close the graph states as

$W_{GN}=\frac1 2 {\rm Identity}- |G_N\rangle\langle G_N|.$

where $\langle W_{GN} \rangle <0$ signals genuine multiparticle entanglement.

Such a witness cannot be measured directly. It has to be decomposed to a sum of correlations terms, which can then be measured. However, for large systems this approach can be difficult.

There are also entanglement witnesses that work in very large systems, and they also detect genuine multipartite entanglement close to graph states. Here, the graph state itself has to be genuine multipartite entangled, that is, it has to correspond to a connected graph. The witnesses need only the minimal two local measurement settings for graph states corresponding to two-colorable graphs. Similar conditions can also be used to put a lower bound on the fidelity with respect to an ideal graph state. These criteria have been used first in an experiment realizing four-qubit cluster states with photons. These approaches have also been used to propose methods for detecting entanglement in a smaller part of a large cluster state or graph state realized in optical lattices.

Bell inequalities have also been developed for cluster states and graph states. All these entanglement conditions and Bell inequalities are based on the stabilizer formalism.

== See also ==
- Entanglement
- Cluster state
- One-way quantum computer
