= Gottesman–Kitaev–Preskill code =

Quantum error correcting code

The Gottesman–Kitaev–Preskill (GKP) code is a quantum error correcting code that encodes logical qubits into the continuous degrees of freedom of a quantum system. It is named after Daniel Gottesman, Alexei Kitaev and John Preskill who published it together in 2001.

The code is used in continuous variable (CV) photonic quantum computing, in which logical qubits are encoded into the field quadratures of an optical mode. These modes can be thought of as the quantum harmonic oscillator with conjugate position and momentum operators. By encoding logical qubits into a single optical mode, the GKP code demonstrates greater hardware efficiency than traditional qubit codes. Instead of needing many qubits to act as redundancy for a single qubit, the GKP code instead requires a precisely constructed optical state. GKP codes are able to protect against both small shifts in the quadratures, but also loss channels such as photon loss in a photonic system.

== Overview ==
GKP codes protects against random shifts in the quadratures, which can be modeled as a Gaussian random displacement channel.
$$\mathcal{N}(\rho) = \int d\mathbf{x}e^{-||\mathbf{x}||^2/2\tilde{\sigma}^2}D(\mathbf{x})\rho D^\dagger(\mathbf{x})$$
This describes a displacement on a state $\rho$ by $x$ with probability $e^{-||\mathbf{x}||^2/2\tilde{\sigma}^2}$ determined by variance $\tilde{\sigma}^2$. $D(\mathbf{x})$ denotes the displacement operator defined as
$$D(x) \equiv \text{exp}(x\hat{a}^\dagger -x^*\hat{a})$$
This unitary operator generates displaced vacuum states in phase space, resulting in coherent states.

The stabilizer group of the GKP code is the set $\{\hat{S}_X^k, S_Z^l\}$, for $k, l \in \mathbb{Z}$. Where $\hat{S}_X = \bar{X}^2 = \hat{D}(2\alpha)$ and $\hat{S}_Z = \bar{Z}^2 = \hat{D}(2\beta)$. The logical Pauli operators $\bar{X}$ and $\bar{Z}$ are defined by displacements over complex $\alpha$ and $\beta$ such that $\bar{X}$ and $\bar{Z}$ anticommute.

Ideal GKP codewords can be constructed (eigenstates of $\hat{S}_X$ and $\hat{S}_Z$) as infinite superpositions of $\delta$ functions in the amplitudes of each quadrature, forming a Dirac comb of even spacing in their quasi-probability distributions. The simplest example is the square code, where the spacing of peaks is the same in both quadratures. In this case, each peak is separated by $2\sqrt{\pi}$ and the logical states can be written as
$$|0_L\rangle = \sum_{j=-\infty}^{\infty} |2j\sqrt{\pi}\rangle_{X_1}$$
$$|1_L\rangle = \sum_{j=-\infty}^{\infty} |(2j+1)\sqrt{\pi}\rangle_{X_1}$$

Errors can be corrected by applying the $\hat{S}_X$ and $\hat{S}_Z$ operators as in any stabilizer code. Since these operators can be implemented with linear optical components, and the code words can be further concatenated with more traditional qubit codes, GKP codes have been studied extensively in regards to error correction in CV quantum computing.

These ideal states, however, are not physical. Not only do they require infinite squeezing in both quadratures, they are also not normalizable. In practice, GKP states must be approximated. These approximate states display finite squeezing, and, in general, an overall Gaussian envelope for normalization.

For instance, $\delta(0)$ can be approximated as a normalized Gaussian of width $\Delta$
$$|\psi_0\rangle = \int_{-\infty}^{\infty}\frac{dq}{(\pi\Delta^2)^{1/4}}e^{\frac{1}{2}x^2/\Delta^2}|x\rangle$$
The approximate codeword then becomes a superposition of such Gaussians, with the aforementioned normalization envelope.
$$|\tilde{0}_L\rangle = N_0\sum_{s=-\infty}^{\infty}e^{-\frac{1}{2}\kappa^2(2s\alpha)^2}T(2s\alpha)|\psi_0\rangle$$
$$|\tilde{1}_L\rangle = N_1\sum_{s=-\infty}^{\infty}e^{-\frac{1}{2}\kappa^2[(2s+1)\alpha]^2}T(2s\alpha)|\psi_0\rangle$$
Where $N_0$ and $N_1$ are normalization factors, and $T(x)$ translates $\hat{X_1}$ by $x$.

This finite squeezing is another source of error, but since the code is designed to protect against small shifts in the quadratures, this error is negligible for modest squeezing. This means that GKP encoding can be easily implemented with the aforementioned optical techniques.

== Experimental realization ==
Physically, GKP states are realized in the following way. First, cat states are generated via Gaussian boson sampling (GBS) techniques, then, the cat states are squeezed and interfered at a beam splitter. Homodyne detection is performed at one output of the beam splitter, and depending on the outcome, an approximate GKP state is created. The output can be further interfered to produce better approximations

Cat states are superpositions of out of phase coherent states. They can be written as
$$|\psi\rangle = \mathcal{N}(|\alpha\rangle+e^{i\phi}|-\alpha\rangle)$$
Where $\mathcal{N}$ is a normalization factor defined as $\mathcal{N}=[2+2e^{(-2\alpha^2)}\cos{\phi}]^{-1/2}$. These states can be generated in a variety of ways with varying efficiencies. Photon subtraction is one approach, which uses squeezed vacuum states, beam splitters, and photon number resolving (PNR) detectors. The beam splitters must be tuned with a high transmissivity however, making this process impractical for state preparation.

The approach pursued by Xanadu is that of GBS. A GBS device consists of an input of squeezed vacuum states, a universal linear interferometer, which can enact any unitary transformation on a given state, and a PNR detector. An $m$ input mode GBS device can produce a non Gaussian state of $m$ peaks. Producing a state with greater number of peaks makes the GKP state production process more efficient, as less iterations must occur to produce approximate states. The input modes are interfered, generating a superposition of Gaussians, which can be further refined into approximate GKP states.

A homodyne detector measures one output of the beam splitter (measuring, in general, $m-1$ modes), heralding approximate cat states. Transforming these cat states to GKP states is a similar process. A beam splitter combines two squeezed multi-peak states, and performs another homodyne measurement on the second mode. The homodyne measurements yielding greater squeezing correspond to the most likely outcomes of measurement, meaning this procedure produces well approximated GKP states with high probability.

== Loss channels ==
GKP codes are primarily designed to protect against small shifts in phase space, but they can also be used to protect against photon loss. Photon loss can be modeled as mixing the GKP state with a vacuum state on a beam splitter with transmittance $\eta$. The effect of this loss is the shrinking of the state by a factor of $\sqrt{\eta}$ in phase space, and shifting the peaks of the state towards the origin. This can result in a shift of magnitude greater than $\sqrt{\pi}/2$—an error outside the correctable distance. It has been shown, however, that loss can be corrected without additional overhead if the GKP state is not squeezed to an unrealistic degree. In fact, techniques to correct explicitly for photon losses introduce more errors than they correct, meaning the GKP code is resistant to both small shifts and loss channels.
