= Qudit =

Unit of information in a quantum computer

In quantum computing, a qudit (/ˈkjuː/dɪt/) or quantum dit is the generalized unit of quantum information described by a superposition of states, where the number of states d is an integer equal to or greater than two. The term "dit" in qudit refers to d-ary digit.

== Standard representation ==
A qudit represents the quantum counterpart of a 𝑑-ary digit, where 𝑑≥2. Its state can be expressed as a vector within the 𝑑-dimensional Hilbert space H_{𝑑}, and it can be written as a linear combination |𝜓⟩=𝛼_{0}· |0⟩+𝛼_{1}· |1⟩+...+𝛼_{𝑑−1} · |𝑑−1⟩, or simplified as vector |𝜓⟩=[𝛼_{0} 𝛼_{1} ...𝛼_{𝑑−1}]^{T}, where 𝛼_{𝑖} ∈ C are the amplitudes relative to the orthonormal basis of the Hilbert space— given by the vectors|0⟩, |1⟩, |2⟩,..., |𝑑−1⟩.

== Etymology ==
Early papers in the 1990s exploring Quantum d-ary systems or non-binary quantum codes began using the term "qudit" to simplify the description of higher-dimensional Hilbert spaces. The term became standardized in the late 1990s and early 2000s with works by researchers like Holevo, Knill, and Gottesman who were developing the foundations for higher-dimensional systems.

== Qudit versus qubit ==
A qudit, characterized by d = 2 states is a qubit.

Qudits with d states greater than 2 can provide a larger Hilbert space, providing more ways to store and process quantum information.

== Qudit states ==
- d = 1 state corresponds to a one-dimensional Hilbert space and is therefore a trivial quantum system.
- Qubit – Qudit with d = 2 states
- Qutrit – Qudit with d = 3 states
- Ququart or Ququat – Qudit with d = 4 states
- Ququint– Qudit with d = 5 states
- Quhexit – Qudit with d = 6 states
- Quoctit – Qudit with d = 8 states
- Qupit – Qudit with prime number dimensions (commonly used in quantum error correction)

== Teleportation ==
Qudit teleportation is the transfer of qudit information from one particle to another at a distant location without moving the physical particle itself. Using entanglement and classical communication, it allows qudit information to be transmitted, with higher dimensional qudit teleportation offering larger data capacity and better noise resilience than lower dimensional qudit teleportation.

In a paper published February 2026 researchers from Jiangxi University of Science and Technology and Gannan Normal University introduced a new resource efficient high dimensional protocol that dramatically reduces the resources needed to transmit information via high-dimensional quantum states. Their research demonstrates a scale of measurement complexity from O(d^{2}) to O (d) therefore reducing the communication overhead resolution and circumventing the previously assumed limits of measurement due to the quadratic growth of measurement (d^{2} Bell states and 2 log_{2} d of classical bits). A quantitative robustness analysis reveals that the protocol remains highly resilient to operational errors, maintaining an efficiency above 99.6\% even under a 0.1 rad phase deviation for d=16, highlighting the expanding advantages of utilizing higher dimensional quantum systems for secure and efficient communication.

== Error correction ==
Quantum decoherence is the natural process where quantum information is lost due to environmental interaction and quantum error correction is a technique that actively combats decoherence.

In a paper published by Nature in May 2025 researchers at Yale first demonstrate quantum error correction past the break-even point for higher dimensional qudit systems. The team used GKP bosonic codes to encode qudits with d = 3 and d = 4 in superconducting cavities and optimized the protocol using reinforcement learning. These findings are regarded as a significant step in the creation of more efficient quantum computers and opens new paths for hardware-lean quantum architectures, fault tolerant computation, and compact error protected memories.

In a paper published September 2025, researchers demonstrate a new hybrid method that encodes information in both light and matter using a cat state qudit with d > 2, which allows for the detection of photon loss through the parity syndrome by entangling a light pulse with ancillary qubits. This method achieves parallel Bell-pair generation by leveraging the multi-level nature of the qudit.

The first open source qudit stabilizer simulator named "Sdim" was announced November 2025 in a pre-print paper on arXiv.

== Qudit logic gates ==
A qudit logic gate (or simply qudit gate) is a basic quantum circuit that acts on a qudit.

To achieve a universal qudit gate, (a gate that can be used to approximate any unitary transformation on a quantum computer to an arbitrary degree of accuracy) a set of gates must include a finite set of single qudit gates and at least one two qudit entangling gate that can create entanglement between qudits.

== Qudit control ==
Qudit control is the precise navigation of a qudit's quantum state through engineered signals to perform quantum computations.

In a paper published December 2025 a team of researchers achieved a breakthrough in qudit control by engineering five level qudits through individually addressable transitions between Zeeman sublevels (see also Zeeman Effect), achieved by combining a large linear Zeeman shift with a state-dependent light shift. Simulations predict state-preparation fidelities of F ≃ 0.99 within ∽1 μs, single-qudit gate fidelities of F ≃ 0.99 with π pulse durations of ∽2.5 μs, and fast destructive imaging with durations below 10 μs. These results establish a broadly applicable framework for high-fidelity control of Zeeman sublevel-encoded qudits and a promising platform for scalable qudit-based quantum technologies.

== Physical implementations ==
Physical support	Name	Information support
Photonic systems	Photonic qudit	Orbital Angular Momentum (OAM), time-bins, frequency/spectral modes, spatial/path modes, or multi-photon states.
Superconducting circuits	Transmon qudit / Bosonic qudit	Higher anharmonic microwave energy levels of the circuit
Trapped ions	Ion qudit	Hyperfine energy levels, Zeeman magnetic sublevels, or metastable optical electronic states within the trapped atomic ions (e.g., ⁴⁰Ca⁺, ¹⁷¹Yb⁺, ¹³⁸Ba⁺).
Neutral atoms	Rydberg qudit / Atomic qudit	Multilevel combinations of hyperfine ground states and highly excited, long-lived Rydberg energy levels.
Polar molecules	Molecular qudit	Rotational, vibrational, and electronic molecular degrees of freedom manipulated by optical traps and dipole-dipole interactions.
Solid-state defects (e.g., NV centers in diamond, SiC)	Color center qudit / Defect qudit	Electron spin states with S > 1/2 (e.g., the intrinsic spin-1 of NV centers) often combined and coupled with adjacent local nuclear spins (e.g., ¹³C, ¹⁴N).
Nuclear Magnetic Resonance (NMR)	NMR qudit	Nuclear spin states of individual nuclei with spin I > 1/2 (quadrupolar nuclei) or manifolds created by coupled multi-spin molecular systems.
Molecular magnets / Spin systems	Molecular spin qudit	High-spin multi-level electron states (S > 1/2) and internal magnetic degrees of freedom within structured magnetic ions or molecules.

== Use in measurement ==
Quantum information is traditionally used in Ramsey interferometry, a technique used for precise measurement across various areas of science and technology.

Qudits with d > 2 have shown to increase precision and resolution of quantum measurements. Qutrits, for example, have shown to achieve a twofold increase in resolution compared to qubits without any reduction in measurement contrast.
