= Hamiltonian quantum computation =

Form of quantum computing

Hamiltonian quantum computation is a form of quantum computing. Unlike methods of quantum computation such as the adiabatic, measurement-based and circuit model where external control is used to apply operations on a register of qubits, Hamiltonian quantum computers operate without external control.

== Background ==
Hamiltonian quantum computation was the pioneering model of quantum computation, first proposed by Paul Benioff in 1980. Benioff's motivation for building a quantum mechanical model of a computer was to have a quantum mechanical description of artificial intelligence and to create a computer that would dissipate the least amount of energy allowable by the laws of physics. However, his model was not time-independent and local. Richard Feynman, independent of Benioff, also wanted to provide a description of a computer based on the laws of quantum physics. He solved the problem of a time-independent and local Hamiltonian by proposing a continuous-time quantum walk that could perform universal quantum computation. Superconducting qubits, Ultracold atoms and non-linear photonics have been proposed as potential experimental implementations of Hamiltonian quantum computers.

== Definition ==
Given a list of quantum gates described as unitaries $U_{1}, U_{2}... U_{k}$, define a hamiltonian

$H = \sum_{i=1}^{k-1} |i+1\rangle\langle i| \otimes U_{i+1} + |i\rangle\langle i + 1| \otimes U_{i+1}^{\dagger}$

Evolving this Hamiltonian on a state $|\phi_{0}\rangle = |100..00\rangle \otimes |\psi_{0}\rangle$ composed of a clock register ( $|100..00\rangle$) that constaines $k+1$ qubits and a data register ($|\psi_{0}\rangle$) will output $|\phi_{k}\rangle = e^{- iHt}|\phi_{0}\rangle$. At a time $t$, the state of the clock register can be $|000..01\rangle$. When that happens, the state of the data register will be $U_{1}, U_{2}... U_{k} |\psi_{0}\rangle$. The computation is complete and $|\phi_{k}\rangle = |000..01\rangle \otimes U_{1}, U_{2}... U_{k} |\psi_{0}\rangle$.

== See also ==
- Adiabatic quantum computation
- One-way quantum computer
