= Universal multiport interferometer =

In quantum mechanics, a universal multiport interferometer (or universal modal unitary) is an optical device capable of imposing general unitary transformations in the modal space of single photons or electromagnetic waves.

Classically, a mode of the electromagnetic (EM) field is defined as a normalized solution to Maxwell's equations in vacuum. In general, a mode of the EM field is represented by a vector field that varies both in space and in time. In optics, the allowed (optical) modes are restricted by the boundary conditions imposed by the system in which they exist (e.g., in an optical fiber or an optical cavity) and are thus solutions to the Helmholtz equation. For example, the Hermite-Gauss optical modes are typically used to describe beams produced in spherical mirror cavities.

To continue, a set of orthonormal modes forms an orthonormal basis which spans a modal space, or Hilbert space. The transformation from one modal basis to another is described by a rotation which, in quantum mechanics, is the action of a unitary operator (e.g., the transformation of Hermite-Gauss optical modes to Laguerre-Gauss optical modes). It has been shown that any discrete modal unitary operator can be realized using successive beam splitters and phase-shifters applied to an $N\times N$ optical beam array. The Reck scheme provides an algorithmic approach to designing an experimental setup that uses such beam splitters and phase-shifters to implement any $N\times N$ modal unitary transformation. The beam splitters and phase-shifters are arranged in a triangular interferometric mesh. Today, such setups are commonly referred to as universal multiport interferometers or universal modal unitaries.

The transformation of a given optical mode into another, more desired optical mode has direct applications to quantum information, optical networking, and photonic computing. The first experimental realization of the Reck scheme was in 2015 by Carolan et al. who used it to implement various linear optical (LO) quantum computing protocols such as heralded quantum logic gates and performing various boson sampling experiments.

== Overview ==
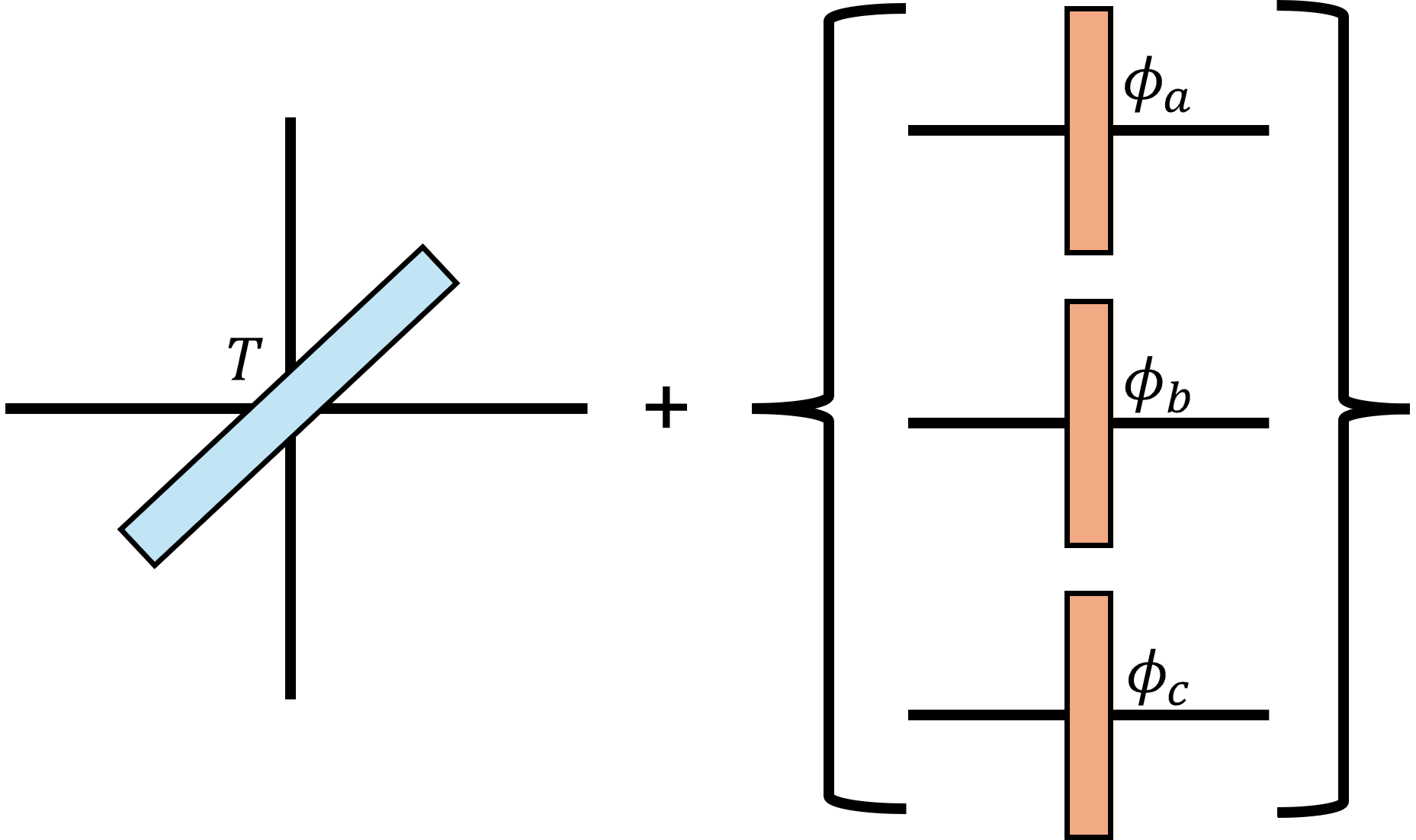
A universal unitary for $2\times 2$ beam transformations can be realized with a beam splitter and three phase shifters. The beam splitter has transmittance $T$, and the three phase shifters impart the phases $\phi_{a}$,$\phi_{b}$, and $\phi_{c}$.

In general, fully determining any $N$-dimensional unitary requires specifying $N^2$ independent real parameters. For the simple case of transforming a two-beam array, a universal modal unitary can be implemented using a variable beam splitter and three phase-shifters. In 1994, Michael Reck and Anton Zeilinger generalized this well-known approach by proving that variable beam splitters and phase-shifters, when arranged in an interferometric mesh with $N^2$ arms, can be used to impose any $N\times N$ (discrete) unitary mode transformation. Using their deterministic algorithm to decompose a given unitary into a triangular network of these two optical elements, it is possible to experimentally realize a discrete universal unitary, specifically for $N\times N$ mode transformations. The resulting device is commonly referred to as a universal multiport interferometer.

In 2016, Clements et al. introduced a variation of Reck and Zeilinger's decomposition, again using beam splitters and phase shifters, but arranged in a symmetrically-crossing network as opposed to a triangular network. Importantly, this variation has a smaller optical depth - the longest path through the interferometric mesh - and thus experiences lower propagation losses.

The two aforementioned methods are strictly different from the universal unitary decomposition commonly used in quantum computing. That is, the universal gate, whereby any $N$-qubit gate can be realized by a circuit of single qubit gates and CNOT gates. The classical analog of such universality is the idea that an arbitrary Boolean function can be realized using a combination of NOT gates and any one of the two-bit gates (e.g. AND, OR).

== Mathematical framework ==
This is an example of a set of intrinsic Euler rotations about a rotating coordinate system. Notice that the first and third rotation axes overlap. This animation was made by Juansempere.

According to the Davenport rotation theorem, any three-dimensional rotation can be decomposed into three elemental rotations about non-orthogonal axes. The axes may be associated with a fixed coordinate system (i.e., extrinsic rotations) or with a rotating coordinate system (i.e., intrinsic rotations), but those associated with the first and third rotations must be in the plane orthogonal to those associated with the second rotation. If the axes associated with the first and third rotations are perpendicular to one another, the Davenport generalized rotations are called Tait-Bryan rotations. However, if the axes associated with the first and third rotations overlap, they are called Euler rotations.

Mathematically, the three composed rotations are represented by a non-commutative product of three matrices. They are non-commutative as the order in which the rotations are applied affects the resulting orientation of the subject.

The elemental rotations each occur within a two-dimensional subspace of the higher-dimensional Euclidean space. In numerical linear algebra, rotations of this type are commonly described by the Givens rotation matrix. They were introduced in the 1950s by Wallace Givens and are used to implement rotations within a plane spanned by two coordinate axes.

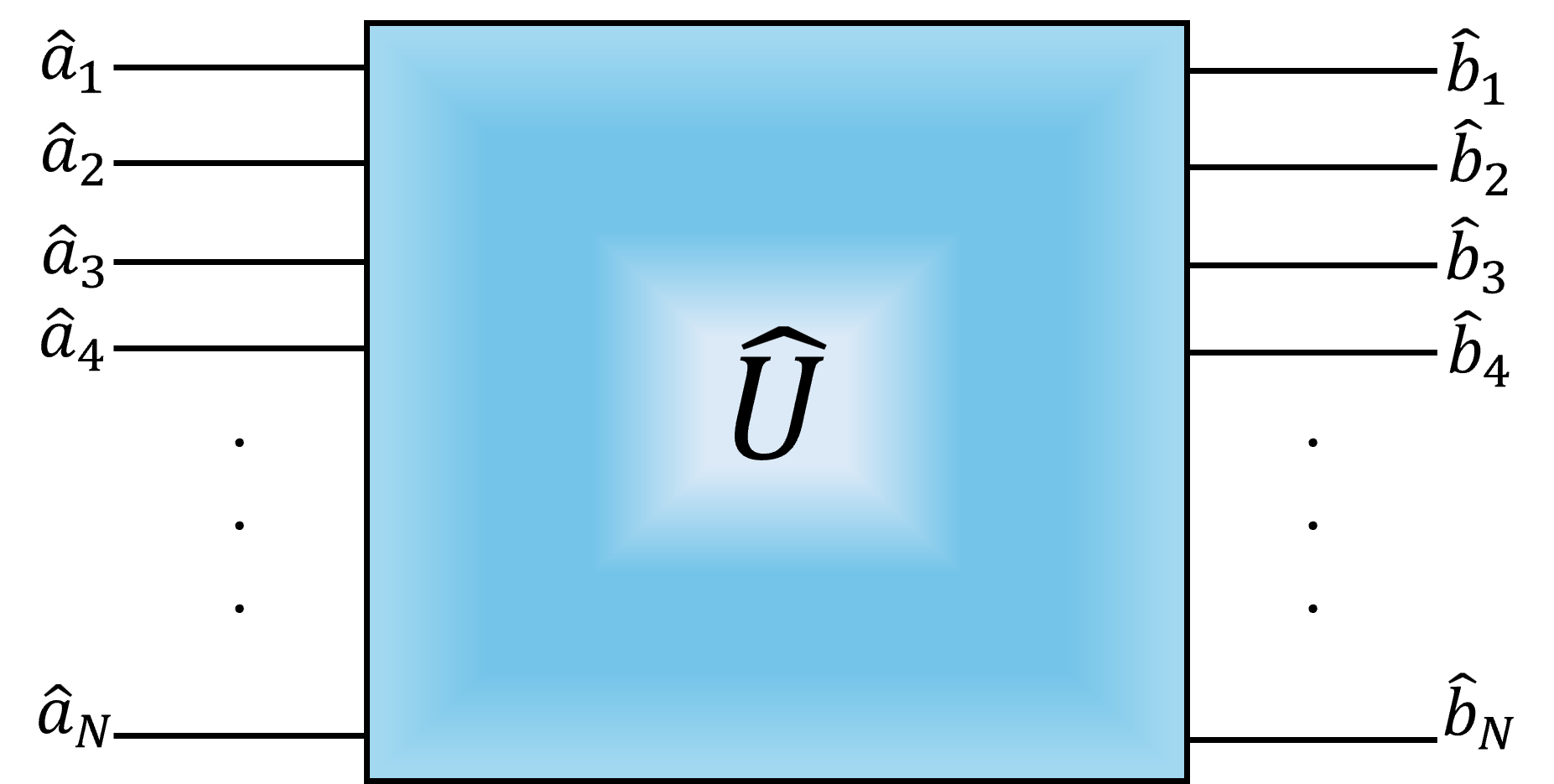
An arbitrary unitary for $N\times N$ mode transformations. The input modes are denoted by their annihilation operators $\hat{a}_{i}$ for modes $i\in\{1,...,N\}$, and the output modes are denoted by their annihilation operators $\hat{b}_{j}$ for modes $j\in\{1,...,N\}$.

Unitary operators are generalizations of the rotation of Euclidean vectors, and thus one can think of constructing a discrete unitary operator in a similar manner to that described by the Davenport rotation theorem. If one can build a tunable device capable of implementing the Givens rotation to a set of optical modes $\{\hat{a}_{i}\}$, then perhaps a chain of such devices could be used to implement any unitary mode transformation $\{\hat{a}_{i}\}\rightarrow\{\hat{b}_{j}\}$. Therefore, the experimental realization of such a Givens rotation device and the proof of its functionality represents a possible method for designing a universal unitary.

=== Givens rotation ===
A Givens rotation is a well-known operation in linear algebra that performs a rotation in a two-dimensional subspace of a higher-dimensional space. Mathematically, it the Givens rotation has the following matrix representation:
$$G(i, j, \phi ) =
\begin{bmatrix}   1   & \cdots &    0   & \cdots &    0   & \cdots &    0   \\
\vdots & \ddots & \vdots &        & \vdots &        & \vdots \\
0   & \cdots &    \cos(\phi)   & \cdots &   \sin(\phi)   & \cdots &    0   \\
\vdots &        & \vdots & \ddots & \vdots &        & \vdots \\
0   & \cdots &    -\sin(\phi)   & \cdots &    \cos(\phi)   & \cdots &    0   \\
\vdots &        & \vdots &        & \vdots & \ddots & \vdots \\
0   & \cdots &    0   & \cdots &    0   & \cdots &    1
\end{bmatrix},$$
where $\{i,j\}$ denote the rows in which the rotation terms appear. The left multiplication of $G( i,j,\phi )$ on another matrix $M$ results in only rows $i$ and $j$ of $M$ being affected. The effect of the Givens operation thus reduces to the transformation of two input amplitudes, $a$ and $b$ (where $a$ and $b$ are elements of the $i$- and $j$-th rows of $M$, respectively), into the new amplitudes, $c$ and $d$, as follows:
$$\begin{bmatrix}
c \\
d
\end{bmatrix}
=
\begin{bmatrix}
\cos \phi & \sin \phi \\
-\sin \phi & \cos \phi
\end{bmatrix}
\begin{bmatrix}
a \\
b
\end{bmatrix}.$$
The Givens rotation can be used to zero out a specific element of a vector (e.g., making $d=0$) or systematically triangularize a matrix, making it essential for linear algebra algorithms like matrix factorization and solving systems of equations.

This is the same matrix that defines the Jacobi rotation, but the choice of angle $\phi$ differs by a factor of approximately 2.

== Experimental motivation ==
In 1986, Mirsalehi et al. proposed a lossless integrated-optical implementation of a Givens rotation device using diffraction from a thick electro-optic grating and phase modulators to perform the necessary operations for efficient and high-speed data processing.

The proposed device operates with two coherent, monochromatic input waves representing amplitudes $a$ and $b$. The phase modulators adjust the relative phase of these inputs, while the diffraction grating computes the sine and cosine components. The outputs $c$ and $d$ are coherently combined to produce the desired rotation.

1. The input and output light signals are guided in waveguides. The use of z-cut lithium niobate waveguides ensures low-loss and high-speed operation.
2. A thick diffraction grating modulated by a voltage generates the sine and cosine multiplications naturally. The input wave amplitudes $a$ and $b$ are processed through the grating to produce transmitted, $\cos(\phi)$, and diffracted, $\sin(\phi)$, components.
3. Electro-optic phase shifters adjust the phases of the optical waves to ensure coherent addition and subtraction, corresponding to the operations required for the rotation matrix.

The final implementation achieves the desired outputs:
$$c = a \cos \phi + b \sin \phi,
\quad
d = -a \sin \phi + b \cos \phi.$$
Mirsalehi et al. proposed using such a Givens device as a building block in lattice filters and wavefront processors. With this in mind, it was already known that such interferometric meshes could perform useful operations, but it was not until nearly a decade later, when Reck et al. published their work that these meshes were shown to implement a universal unitary.

== Reck and Zeilinger Scheme ==
Reck et al. showed that a triangular arrangement of $2\times 2$ beam splitters and phase-shifters could be systematically programmed, using a straightforward analytical approach, to implement any unitary transformation across a set of optical channels. The notation below is from the second-quantization formulation of quantum optics. In particular, the creation operator $\hat{a}^{\dagger}_{j}$ represents the addition of a photon to a specific plane wave mode $j$.

=== Phase-shifters ===
A phase-shifter adds a phase $\phi$ to the state of a photon passing through it. In terms of creation operators, it performs the following transformation:

$\hat{a}^{\dagger}_{\text{out}}=e^{i\phi} \hat{a}^{\dagger}_{\text{in}}.$

The same phase $\phi$ can be achieved by propagating through a material with linear refractive index $n$ and thickness $d$, where:

$\phi = n \frac{2\pi}{\lambda} d.$

=== Beam splitters ===
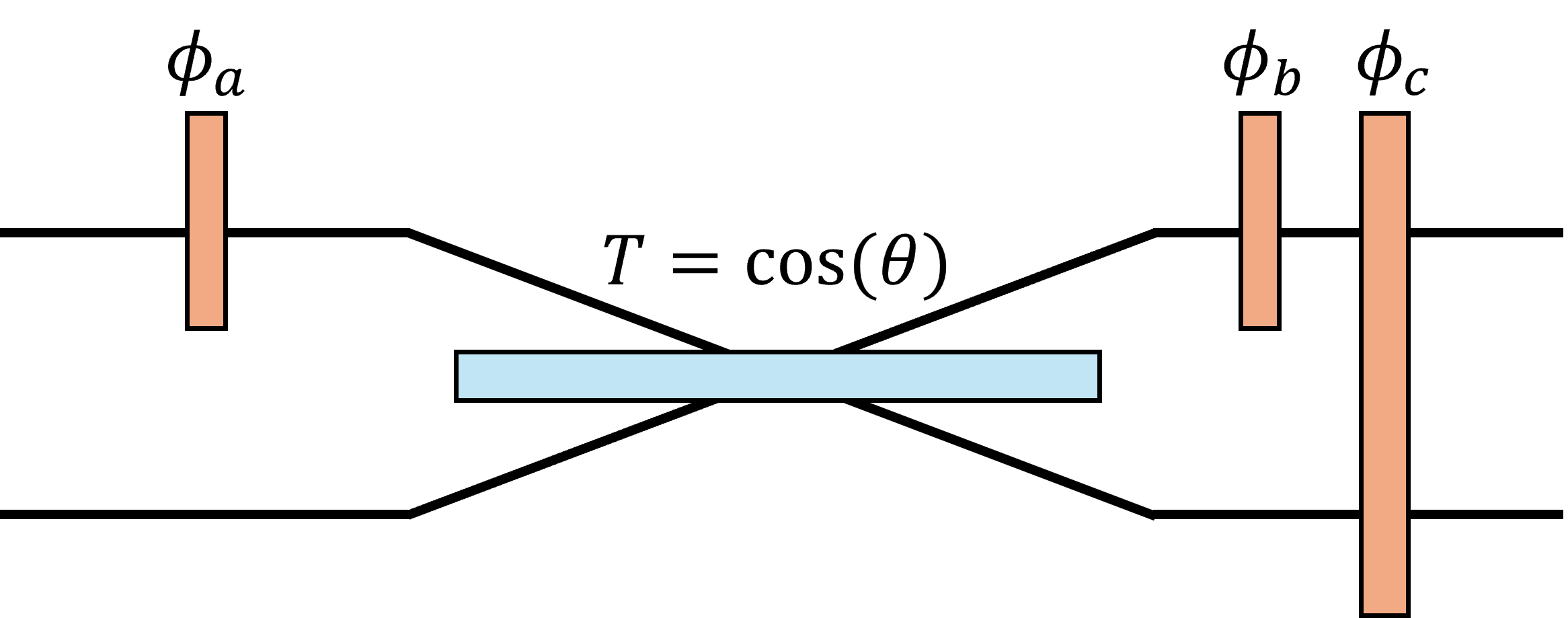
A general setup for implementing any $2\times 2$ beam transformation. This represents a universal unitary for such class of transformations.

A beam splitter mixes two input modes $\hat{a}^{\dagger}$and $\hat{b}^{\dagger}$, producing two output modes $\hat{c}^{\dagger}$ and $\hat{d}^{\dagger}$. The transformations are given by:
$$\hat{c}^\dagger = \cos\theta \, \hat{a}^\dagger + i \sin\theta \, e^{-i\phi} \hat{b}^\dagger, \text{  and  }
\hat{d}^\dagger = i \sin\theta \, e^{i\phi} \hat{a}^\dagger + \cos\theta \, \hat{b}^\dagger.$$
The universal unitary for $2\times 2$ beam transformations is more commonly written in the following form:
$$U(\theta, \phi)=\exp{\left(i \phi_{c} \right)}\cdot\begin{bmatrix}
\cos\left(\theta\right)\exp{\left(i\phi_{a}+i\phi_{b}\right)}  & -\sin\left(\theta\right)\exp{\left(i\phi_{b}\right)} \\
\sin\left(\theta\right) \exp{\left(i \phi_{a} \right)} & \cos\left(\theta\right)
\end{bmatrix},$$
which is a combination of the modified Givens rotation matrix seen above and three phase-shifters, namely $\exp{\left(i\phi_{a}\right)}$, $\exp{\left(i\phi_{b}\right)}$, and $\exp{\left(i\phi_{c}\right)}$. The transmittance of the beam splitter appears in the matrix as $T=\cos{(\theta)}$. These are the four free parameters which must be set to fully characterize the $2\times 2$ unitary matrix (as expected, $N^{2}=4$). The third phase-shifter, $\exp{\left(i\phi_{c}\right)}$, represents a global offset which can usually be neglected in most practical applications, though it does play an important role when considering geometric phase.

In the notation of Reck et al., the $2\times 2$ beam transformation is written as,
$$U(\omega, \phi) = \begin{bmatrix}
\sin\left(\omega\right)\exp{(i\phi)}  & \cos\left(\omega\right)\exp{(i\phi)} \\
\cos\left(\omega\right) & -\sin\left(\omega\right)
\end{bmatrix},$$
where the missing free parameters are accounted for in a new matrix $D$ which will be introduced below.

=== Algorithm ===
The objective is to determine the set of matrices $\{T_{N,q}\}$ such that:
$$U(N)\cdot T_{(N, N-1)}\cdot T_{(N, N-2)}\cdots T_{(2, 1)} \cdot D=I(N),$$
where $N$ and $q=N-1,...,1$ are the port numbers in the triangular mesh. The matrix $T_{N,q}$ is a modified Givens rotation matrix.

Step 1: Initial multiplication

Multiply $U(N)$ from the right by a succession of matrices $T_{(N,q)}(\omega_{N,q},\phi_{N,q } )$ for $q=N-1,...,1$. This is where the matrix $T_{( N, q)}$ is an $N$-dimensional identity matrix with the elements $I_{NN},I_{Nq},I_{qN},$ and $I_{qq }$ replaced by the corresponding $2\times 2$ beam transformation matrix elements. Hence, it represents a modified Givens rotation matrix.

By the properties of the Givens rotation matrix, $\omega_{Nq}$ and $\phi_{Nq}$ in $T_{(N,q)}(\omega_{N,q},\phi_{N,q } )$ can be chosen such that, upon multiplication with $U(N)$, the resulting matrix element at $(N,q)$ vanishes. Changing the index $q\rightarrow q'<q$ and performing another multiplication with specially chosen values of $\omega_{N,q'}$ and $\phi_{N,q'}$, the resulting matrix element at $(N,q')$ vanishes. Repeating successive multiplications until the index $q=1$ is reached will result in the last row vanishing (expect the on-diagonal element which remains 1). Due to the unitarity of each transformation, the rightmost column will also vanish (again, expect the on-diagonal element which remains 1). This step reduces the effective dimension of $U$ to $N-1$.
$$U(N) \cdot T_{(N,N-1)} \cdot T_{(N,N-2)} \cdots T_{(N,1)} =
\begin{bmatrix}
\begin{bmatrix}
U(N-1)
\end{bmatrix} & 0\\
0 & e^{i\alpha}
\end{bmatrix}.$$
Step 2: Recursive multiplication

Multiply the reduced matrix from the right by a succession of matrices $T_{(N-1,q)}(\omega_{N-1,q},\phi_{N-1,q} )$ for $q=N-2,...,1$. Following the same thought-process as in step 1, this will result in the second-to-last row vanishing and by unitarity, the second-to-rightmost column vanishing (except for the on-diagonal element). The resulting reduced matrix is of the following form:
$$U(N)\cdot T_{(N,N-1)}\cdot T_{(N,N-2)}\cdots T_{(N,1)} \cdot T_{(N-1,N-2)} \cdot T_{(N-1,N-3)} \cdots T_{(N-1,1)} =
\begin{bmatrix}
\begin{bmatrix}
U(N-2)
\end{bmatrix} & 0 & 0\\
0 & e^{i\beta} & 0\\
0 & 0 & e^{i\alpha}
\end{bmatrix}.$$
Repeating this step in a recursive fashion until the matrix multiplication involves $T_{(2,1)}(\omega_{2,1},\phi_{2,1} )$ will result in a transformed diagonal matrix. Notice that the elements along the diagonal have modulus of unity.

Step 3: Recovering the unitary

The final step is to separate the unitary $U(N)$ from the successive $U(2)$ transformations. This is accomplished by multiplying the transformed diagonal matrix by another diagonal matrix $D$ whose elements are also modulus of unity such that the outcome is the identity matrix:
$$U(N)\cdot T_{(N,N-1)}\cdot T_{(N,N-2)}\cdots T_{(2,1)} \cdot D= I(N).$$
In practice, $D$ represents a set of phase shifters that compensate for the phases appearing along the diagonal of the transformed matrix.

By the properties of the identity matrix, the product of the final transformed matrix and $D$ represents the inverse of $U(N)$,
$$U(N)= \left(T_{(N,N-1)}\cdot T_{(N,N-2)}\cdots T_{(2,1)} \cdot D\right)^{-1}.$$

=== Experimental implementation ===
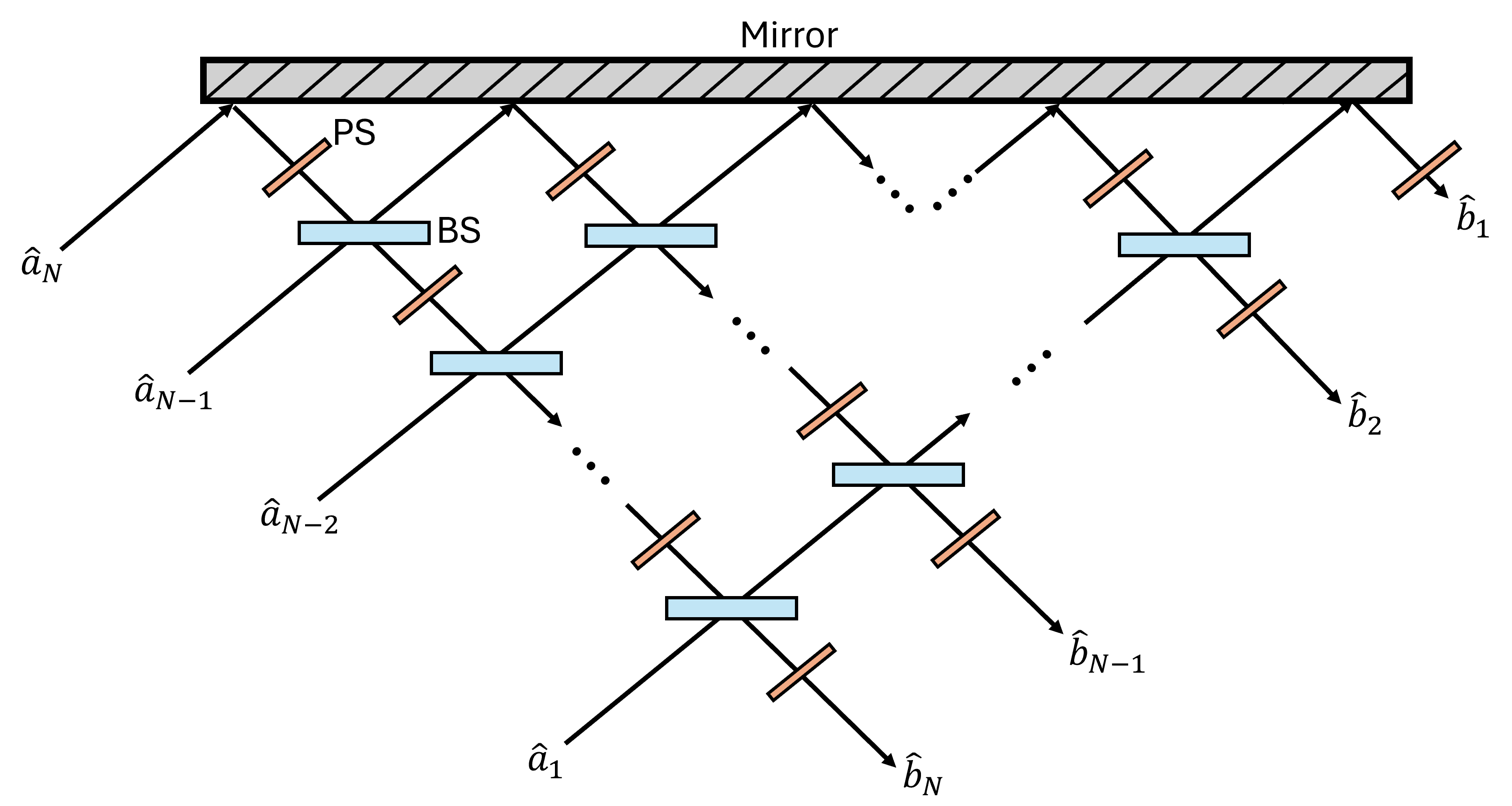
The experimental implementation of the universal unitary described by the Reck scheme developed by Reck and Zeilinger. At each beam crossing within the triangular mesh, a beam splitter (depicted by blue rectangles and labelled "BS") is placed to perform the desired $2\times 2$ beam transformation. Each beam splitter is assigned a phase-shifter (depicted by orange rectangles and labelled "PS") at one of the inputs. There are additional phase-shifters at each of the final output ports of the multiport interferometer. This figure is derived from the original figure of Reck et al. in the paper Experimental Realization of any Discrete Unitary Operator.

The experimental setup predicted by the Reck algorithm is described entirely by
$$\left(T_{ (N,N-1) } \cdot T_{(N,N-2)} \cdots
T_{(2,1)} \cdot D\right)^{-1}.$$
Each matrix in this product has an experimental counterpart. That is, each $T$ matrix represents the $2\times 2$ beam transformation and thus can be implemented by an individual beam splitter, and the diagonal matrix $D$ can be realized by an additional set of phase-shifters.

The maximum number of beam splitters needed for a general $U(N)$ is $\binom{N}{2}=\frac{N(N-1)}{2}$. Since each beam splitter has two free parameters, that is $N(N-1)$ free parameters in addition to the $N$ free parameters from $D$. This corresponds to a total of $N^2$ free parameters that must be controlled, as expected.

According to Reck et al., the practical implementation of this scheme is a triangular array of beam splitters and phase-shifters. This is where each beam splitter has an associated phase-shifter at one of its input ports. In addition, phase-shifters are placed at each of the final output ports of the multiport interferometer to perform final phase corrections.

This interferometric mesh essentially contains $N$ individual interferometers that all require phase stability. This represents the main challenge to experimentally implementing the Reck scheme in free-space.

== Applications ==
In 2015, Jacques Carolan, Jeremy O'Brien, Anthony Laing, and colleagues experimentally implemented, for the first time, the Reck scheme for the purpose of demonstrating various linear optical (LO) quantum computing protocols. Their device utilized the Reck scheme, but had two key differences:

1. Their device was implemented in integrated optics and thus did not rely on the free-space propagation of light between the interferometers in the mesh.
2. Instead of using variable transmittivity ($T$) beam splitters at each node of the interferometric mesh, they used Mach-Zehnder interferometers containing tunable phase shifters.

The consequence of the first difference is that their device did not require extremely precise or tedious phase stabilization techniques. The consequence of the second difference is that their device was entirely controlled by phase and not a combination of phase and variable transmittivity.

In particular, their reprogrammable device functioned as a universal six-port interferometer and thus a universal unitary in the modal space spanned by up to six optical modes. It consisted of 15 Mach-Zehnder interferometers and a total of 30 thermo-optic phase shifters. Their measurements were performed using a 12-single-photon detector system.

They used their device to realize a controlled-NOT quantum logic gate and performed full quantum process tomography finding a process fidelity of $F_{\text{p}} = 0.909\pm0.001$ and an average gate fidelity of $F_{\text{g}} = 0.927\pm0.001$. In addition, they implemented 100 Haar random unitaries with an average fidelity of $F = 0.999\pm0.001$, and six-dimensional complex Hadamard matrices. Finally, they demonstrated the use of their device in performing Boson sampling with six-photon verification tests.

The implementation of the Reck scheme in this form has been highly influential in the field of optics and photonic computing. They have since been used to demonstrate quantum walks, generate entangled qutrit states, and implement the Fast Fourier transform algorithm. In addition, they have been made in ultraviolet-written silica-on-silicon chips.

== See also ==
- Unitary operator
- Unitary transformation
- Universal quantum gate
- Givens rotation
- Interferometry
