= Clifford gate =

Definition of quantum circuits

In quantum computing and quantum information theory, the Clifford gates are the elements of the Clifford group, a set of mathematical transformations which normalize the n-qubit Pauli group, i.e., map tensor products of Pauli matrices to tensor products of Pauli matrices through conjugation. The notion was introduced by Daniel Gottesman and is named after the mathematician William Kingdon Clifford. Quantum circuits that consist of only Clifford gates can be efficiently simulated with a classical computer due to the Gottesman–Knill theorem.

The Clifford group is generated by three gates: Hadamard, phase gate S, and CNOT. This set of gates is minimal in the sense that discarding any one gate results in the inability to implement some Clifford operations; removing the Hadamard gate disallows powers of ${1}/{\sqrt{2}}$ in the unitary matrix representation, removing the phase gate S disallows $i$ in the unitary matrix, and removing the CNOT gate reduces the set of implementable operations from $\mathbf{C}_n$ to $\mathbf{C}_1^n$. Since all Pauli matrices can be constructed from the phase and Hadamard gates, each Pauli gate is also trivially an element of the Clifford group.

The $Y$ gate is equal to the product of $X$ and $Z$ gates. To show that a unitary $U$ is a member of the Clifford group, it suffices to show that for all $P \in \mathbf{P}_n$ that consist only of the tensor products of $X$ and $Z$, we have $UPU^\dagger \in \mathbf{P}_n$.

== Common generating gates ==
=== Hadamard gate ===
The Hadamard gate

$$H = \frac{1}{\sqrt{2}} \begin{bmatrix} 1 & 1 \\ 1 & -1 \end{bmatrix}$$

is a member of the Clifford group as $HXH^\dagger = Z$ and $HZH^\dagger = X$.

=== S gate ===
The phase gate

$$S = \begin{bmatrix} 1 & 0 \\ 0 & e^{i \frac{\pi}{2}} \end{bmatrix} = \begin{bmatrix} 1 & 0 \\ 0 & i \end{bmatrix} = \sqrt{Z}$$

is a Clifford gate as $SXS^\dagger = Y$ and $SZS^\dagger = Z$.

=== CNOT gate ===
The CNOT gate applies to two qubits. It is a (C)ontrolled NOT gate, where a NOT gate is performed on qubit 2 if and only if qubit 1 is in the 1 state.

$$\mathrm{CNOT} = \begin{bmatrix} 1 & 0 & 0 & 0 \\
0 & 1 & 0 & 0 \\ 0 & 0 & 0 & 1 \\ 0 & 0 & 1 & 0 \end{bmatrix}.$$

Between $X$ and $Z$ there are four options:

CNOT combinations
$P$	CNOT $P$ CNOT$^\dagger$
$X \otimes I$	$X \otimes X$
$I \otimes X$	$I \otimes X$
$Z \otimes I$	$Z \otimes I$
$I \otimes Z$	$Z \otimes Z$

== Building a universal set of quantum gates ==
The Clifford gates do not form a universal set of quantum gates as some gates outside the Clifford group cannot be arbitrarily approximated with a finite set of operations. An example is the phase shift gate (historically known as the $\pi /8$ gate):

$$T = \begin{bmatrix} 1 & 0 \\ 0 & e^{i \frac{\pi}{4}} \end{bmatrix} = \sqrt{S} = \sqrt[4]{Z}$$.

The following shows that the $T$ gate does not map the Pauli-$X$ gate to another Pauli matrix:

$$TX{T^\dagger } = \left[ {\begin{array}{*{20}{c}}
1&0 \\
0&{{e^{i\frac{\pi }{4}}}}
\end{array}} \right]\left[ {\begin{array}{*{20}{c}}
0&1 \\
1&0
\end{array}} \right]\left[ {\begin{array}{*{20}{c}}
1&0 \\
0&{{e^{ - i\frac{\pi }{4}}}}
\end{array}} \right] = \left[ {\begin{array}{*{20}{c}}
0&{{e^{ - i\frac{\pi }{4}}}} \\
{{e^{i\frac{\pi }{4}}}}&0
\end{array}} \right]\not  \in {{\mathbf{P}}_1}$$

However, the Clifford group, when augmented with the $T$ gate, forms a universal quantum gate set for quantum computation. Moreover, exact, optimal circuit implementations of the single-qubit $Z$-angle rotations are known.

== See also ==
- Magic state distillation
- Clifford algebra
