= Daniel Gottesman =

American physicist

- Born: January 16, 1970 (age 56)
- Education: Caltech
- Known for: Gottesman–Knill theorem Gottesman–Kitaev–Preskill code Clifford gates
- Scientific career
- Fields: Physics
- Doctoral advisor: John Preskill

Daniel Gottesman is a physicist, known for his work regarding quantum error correction, in particular the invention of the stabilizer formalism for quantum error-correcting codes, Gottesman–Kitaev–Preskill code and the Gottesman–Knill theorem. He is a faculty member at the University of Maryland.

Gottesman completed a B.A. in physics at Harvard University (1992) and a Ph.D. in physics at Caltech (1997). He is a Fellow of the American Physical Society (2013). In 2003, he was named to the MIT Technology Review TR100 as one of the top 100 innovators in the world under the age of 35.

== See also ==
- Clifford gates
- Continuous-variable quantum information
