= Entanglement (graph measure) =

In graph theory, entanglement of a directed graph is a number measuring how strongly the cycles of the graph are intertwined. It is defined in terms of a mathematical game in which n cops try to capture a robber, who escapes along the edges of the graph. Similar to other graph measures, such as cycle rank, some algorithmic problems, e.g. parity game, can be efficiently solved on graphs of bounded entanglement.

== Definition ==
The entanglement game is played by n cops against a robber on a directed graph G. Initially, all cops are outside the graph and the robber selects an arbitrary starting vertex v of G. Further on, the players move in turn. In each move the cops either stay where they are, or place one of them on the vertex currently occupied by the robber. The robber must move from her current vertex, along an edge, to a successor that is not occupied by a cop. The robber must move if no cop is following him. If there is no free successor to which the robber can move, she is caught, and the cops win. The robber wins if she cannot be caught, i.e. if the play can be made to last forever.

A graph G has entanglement n if n cops win in the entanglement game on G but n − 1 cops lose the game.

== Properties and applications ==
Graphs of entanglement zero and one can be characterized as follows:

- entanglement of G is 0 if and only if G is acyclic
- entanglement of G is 1 if and only if G is not acyclic, and in every strongly connected component of G there is a node whose removal makes the component acyclic.

Entanglement has also been a key notion in proving that the variable hierarchy of the modal mu calculus is strict.
