= Alexei Kitaev =

Russian-American physicist (born 1963)

Alexei Yurievich Kitaev
- Алексей Юрьевич Китаев
- Born: August 23, 1963 (age 63); Soviet Union
- Education: Moscow Institute of Physics and Technology
- Known for: Kitaev chain Kitaev spin liquid Kitaev's periodic table Toric code Sachdev–Ye–Kitaev model Quantum phase estimation Solovay–Kitaev theorem Magic state distillation Gottesman–Kitaev–Preskill code Quantum threshold theorem QIP; QMA
- Awards: Breakthrough Prize in Fundamental Physics (2012); Dirac Medal (2015); Oliver E. Buckley Condensed Matter Prize (2017); Henri Poincaré Prize (2024)
- Scientific career
- Fields: Condensed matter theory Quantum computing
- Workplaces: California Institute of Technology; Kavli Institute for Theoretical Physics
- Thesis: Electronic properties of quasicrystals (Russian: Электронные свойства квазикристаллов) (1989)
- Doctoral advisor: Valery Pokrovsky

Alexei Yurievich Kitaev (Russian: Алексей Юрьевич Китаев; born August 26, 1963) is a Russian-American theoretical physicist.

He is currently a professor of theoretical physics and mathematics at the California Institute of Technology.

Kitaev has received multiple awards recognizing his contributions to quantum information science and condensed matter physics, particularly in quantum computation and topological phases of matter.

== Life ==
Kitaev was educated in Russia, graduating from the Moscow Institute of Physics and Technology in 1986, and with a Ph.D. from the Landau Institute for Theoretical Physics under the supervision of Valery Pokrovsky in 1989.

Kitaev worked as a research associate at the Landau Institute between 1989 and 1998. Between 1999 and 2001, he served as a researcher at Microsoft Research. Since 2002, Kitaev has been a professor at Caltech.

In 2021, Kitaev was elected into the National Academy of Sciences.

== Research ==
=== Quantum computing and complexity ===
Kitaev has made contributions to quantum algorithms, quantum complexity classes, and fault-tolerant quantum computation. He introduced the complexity class QMA (Quantum Merlin–Arthur) and proved that the k-local Hamiltonian problem is QMA-complete, linking ground-state energy problems for local Hamiltonians to questions in computational complexity.

He introduced the quantum phase estimation algorithm, a general procedure for estimating eigenphases of unitary operators, and independently proved what is now known as the Solovay–Kitaev theorem, which shows that a universal finite gate set can efficiently approximate arbitrary quantum operations on qubits.

He proposed using topological phases of matter and anyons for fault-tolerant quantum computation, introducing the toric code (or surface code) as a paradigmatic error-correcting code. He also contributed to threshold theorems for fault-tolerant codes and co-developed protocols such as the Gottesman–Kitaev–Preskill code and Bravyi–Kitaev magic-state distillation.

=== Topological phases and lattice models ===
Kitaev introduced exactly solvable lattice Hamiltonians that realize topologically ordered phases and anyonic excitations in two spatial dimensions. His toric code and related quantum-double models provide toy models realizing anyons and long-range entanglement. His Kitaev honeycomb model is an exactly solvable spin-1/2 model that can realize non-abelian anyons; this model has become a common starting point for the study of "Kitaev quantum spin liquids" in candidate materials.

He has also contributed to the classification of topological phases. He related two-dimensional lattice models of topological order to algebraic data describing the anyon types and their braiding, together with a bulk invariant specifying the chiral central charge. His "periodic table for topological insulators and superconductors" uses K-theory and Bott periodicity to classify gapped free-fermion phases in different symmetry classes and spatial dimensions, and in two dimensions he proposed the "16-fold way" classification of certain topological superconductors. The so-called $E_8$ state introduced by Kitaev appears as a basic nontrivial 2+1-dimensional invertible phase, and his ideas have been used in generalized-cohomology classifications of symmetry-protected topological phases with symmetry group G.

Kitaev has also contributed to the study of quantum chaos and holography through his work on the Sachdev–Ye–Kitaev (SYK) model.

== Honors and awards ==
Year	Award	Institution	Reason
2008	MacArthur Fellows Program	MacArthur Foundation	Contributions to the field of quantum computing and quantum physics
2012	Breakthrough Prize in Fundamental Physics	Breakthrough Prizes Board	For the theoretical development of implementing quantum memories and fault-tolerant quantum computation
2015	Dirac Medal (ICTP)	International Centre for Theoretical Physics	For the interdisciplinary contributions in condensed matter systems and applications of these ideas to quantum computing.
2017	Oliver E. Buckley Prize (with Xiao-Gang Wen)	American Physical Society	For theories of topological order and its consequences in a broad range of physical systems
2024	Henri Poincaré Prize	International Association of Mathematical Physics	Contributions to the development of quantum computing, the study of quantum many-body systems and quantum information
2024	Basic Science Lifetime Award	International Congress of Basic Science	Contributions to the development of quantum computing

== Political activism ==
In March, 2022, he was one of 78 Breakthrough Prize Laureates whose names appeared on an "open letter" criticizing the Russian invasion of Ukraine.

== See also ==
- Kitaev chain
- Magic state distillation
- Quantum threshold theorem
- Quantum Interactive Polynomial time
- Solovay–Kitaev theorem
- Topological entanglement entropy
- Toric code
