= Gottesman–Knill theorem =

Theorem of quantum circuits

In quantum computing, the Gottesman–Knill theorem is a theoretical result by Daniel Gottesman and Emanuel Knill that states that stabilizer circuits—circuits that only consist of gates from the normalizer of the qubit Pauli group, also called Clifford group—can be perfectly simulated in polynomial time on a probabilistic classical computer. The Clifford group can be generated solely by using the controlled NOT, Hadamard, and phase gates (CNOT, H and S); and therefore stabilizer circuits can be constructed using only these gates.

The reason for the speed up of quantum computers compared to classical ones is not yet fully understood. The Gottesman-Knill theorem proves that all quantum algorithms whose speed up relies on entanglement that can be achieved with CNOT and Hadamard gates do not achieve any computational advantage relative to classical computers, due to the classical simulability of such algorithms (and the particular types of entangled states they can produce).

Since the theorem's initial statement, more efficient constructions for simulating such stabilizer (Clifford) circuits have been identified with an implementation.

The Gottesman–Knill theorem was published in a single-author paper by Gottesman, in which he credits Knill with the result, through private communication.

== Formal statement ==
Theorem: A quantum circuit using only the following elements can be simulated efficiently on a classical computer:

1. Preparation of qubits in computational-basis states.
2. Clifford gates (generated by the Hadamard gate, controlled NOT gate, and phase gate S ).
3. Measurements in the computational basis.

The Gottesman–Knill theorem shows that even some highly entangled states can be simulated efficiently on a classical computer. Several important types of quantum algorithms use only Clifford gates, including the standard algorithms for entanglement distillation and quantum error correction. From a practical point of view, stabilizer circuits on n qubits can be simulated in O(n log n) time using the graph state formalism.

== See also ==
- Clifford gates
- Magic state distillation
- Stabilizer code
