= Pauli group =

16-element matrix group

The Möbius–Kantor graph, the Cayley graph of the Pauli group with generators x, y, and z

In physics, quantum information and group theory, the Pauli group is a group formed by tensor products of Pauli matrices, including the identity. The single-qubit Pauli group is a 16-element matrix group, consisting of the 4 Pauli matrices each with 4 possible phase factors. The n-qubit Pauli group is a $4^{n+1}$-element group consisting of tensor products of single-qubit Paulis.

In quantum information theory, Pauli groups are important because they are the basis for stabilizer formalism, a widely-used framework for constructing and describing quantum error correction codes using sets of commuting Pauli operators. Stabilizer codes are formed from commuting subgroups of the Pauli group.

== Single-qubit Pauli group ==
The Pauli group consists of the 2 × 2 identity matrix $I$ and all of the Pauli matrices

$$X = \sigma_1 =
\begin{pmatrix}
0&1\\
1&0
\end{pmatrix},\quad
Y = \sigma_2 =
\begin{pmatrix}
0&-i\\
i&0
\end{pmatrix},\quad
Z = \sigma_3 =
\begin{pmatrix}
1&0\\
0&-1
\end{pmatrix}$$,

together with the products of these matrices with the factors $\pm 1$ and $\pm i$:

$$G \ \stackrel{\mathrm{def}}{=}\   \{\pm I,\pm iI,\pm X,\pm iX,\pm Y,\pm iY,\pm Z,\pm iZ\} \equiv \langle X, Y, Z \rangle$$.

The Pauli group is generated by the Pauli matrices, and like them it is named after Wolfgang Pauli.

As an abstract group, $G \ \cong C_4 \circ D_4$ is the central product of a cyclic group of order 4 and the dihedral group of order 8.

The Pauli group is a representation of the gamma group in three-dimensional Euclidean space. It is not isomorphic to the gamma group; it is less free, in that its chiral element is $\sigma_1\sigma_2\sigma_3=iI$ whereas there is no such relationship for the gamma group.

=== Pauli algebra ===
The Pauli algebra is the algebra of 2 x 2 complex matrices M(2, C) with matrix addition and matrix multiplication. It has a long history beginning with the biquaternions introduced by W. R. Hamilton in his Lectures on Quaternions (1853). The representation with matrices was noted by L. E. Dickson in 1914. Publications by Pauli eventually led to the eponym now in use. Basis elements of the algebra generate the Pauli group.

== Multi-qubit Pauli group ==
The Pauli group on $n$ qubits, $G_n$, is the group generated by the operators described above applied to each of $n$ qubits in the tensor product Hilbert space $(\mathbb{C}^2)^{\otimes n}$. That is,

$$G_n = \langle P_1 \otimes \cdots \otimes P_n : P_i \in \{I, X, Y, Z \} \rangle = \{ c \cdot P_1 \otimes \cdots \otimes P_n : c \in \{\pm 1, \pm i\}, P_i \in \{I, X, Y, Z \} \}.$$

The order of $G_n$ is $4 \cdot 4^n$ since a scalar $\pm 1$ or $\pm i$ factor in any tensor position can be moved to any other position.

=== Notations ===
An $n$-qubit Pauli operator that only acts on a single qubit is often denoted as a single Pauli letter with an integer subscript. For example, in a system with 3 qubits,

$$X_1 \equiv X \otimes I \otimes I, \qquad Z_2 \equiv I \otimes Z \otimes I.$$

Multi-qubit Pauli operators can be written as products of single-qubit Paulis on disjoint qubits. Alternatively, when it is clear from context, the tensor product symbol $\otimes$ can be omitted, i.e. unsubscripted Pauli matrices written consecutively represents tensor product rather than matrix product. For example:

$$XZI \equiv X_1Z_2 = X \otimes Z \otimes I.$$

=== Properties ===
Operators in $G_n$ can also be represented as $2^n \times 2^n$ matrices. An operator $P = c \cdot P_1 \otimes \cdots \otimes P_n$ always has two distinct eigenvalues, either $\pm 1$ or $\pm i$ depending on whether the scalar factor $c$ is $\pm 1$ or $\pm i$. An operator with eigenvalues $\pm 1$ is Hermitian, and one with eigenvalues $\pm i$ is anti-Hermitian. In either case, a set of $2^n$ eigenvectors of $P$ can be constructed by taking tensor products of eigenvectors of each $P_i$, with the eigenvalue being $c$ times the product of the eigenvalues of each factor.

Two operators in $G_n$ either commute or anti-commute, depending on whether the number of anti-commuting pairs of single-qubit Pauli operators at the same location is even or odd. For example, $XXX$ and $ZZX$ commute with each other since there are exactly two anti-commuting pairs (on qubits 1 and 2), but $XXX$ and $ZZZ$ anti-commute since there are three such pairs.

=== Binary vector representation ===
A simple but useful mapping $N$ exists between the binary vector space $(\mathbb{Z}_{2})^{2}$ and the set of Pauli matrices $\{I, X, Y, Z\}$:

$00 \to I, \; 01 \to X, \; 11 \to Y, \; 10 \to Z.$

This mapping allows a multi-qubit Pauli operator to be represented as a binary vectors with a phase factor, and operations on these operators to be defined as binary operations rather than matrix operations.

Some useful properties of this mapping becomes evident when the phaseless Pauli operators $I, X, Y, Z$ are regarded as representatives of equivalence classes in the quotient group $[G] = G / \{\pm 1, \pm i\}$ (where $G$ is the single-qubit Pauli group). For $P \in G$, denote the equivalence class represented by $P$ as

$[P] = \{\beta P \mid \beta \in \{\pm 1, \pm i\}\}.$

Note that $[G]$ is a commutative group since two Pauli operators either commute or anti-commute, but $[-P] = [P]$.

The map $N$ now induces an isomorphism $[N] : (\mathbb{Z}_{2})^{2} \mapsto [G]$, i.e., addition of vectors in $(\mathbb{Z}_{2})^{2}$ is equivalent to multiplication of Pauli operators up to a global phase:

$[N(u + v)] = [N(u)][N(v)].$

Furthermore, let $\odot$ denote the symplectic product between two elements $u, v \in (\mathbb{Z}_{2})^{2}$, where $u = z \vert x$ and $v = z' \vert x'$ (this notation represents binary string concatenation, e.g., $01 \equiv 0 \vert 1$), $z, x, z', x' \in \mathbb{Z}_{2}$:

$u \odot v \equiv zx' - xz'.$

Then the symplectic product $\odot$ gives the commutation relations of elements of $G$:

$N(u)N(v) = (-1)^{(u \odot v)}N(v)N(u).$

The symplectic product and the mapping $N$ thus give a useful way to phrase Pauli relations in terms of binary algebra.

The above definitions can be straightforwardly extended to multiple qubits, defining a mapping $\mathbf{N} : (\mathbb{Z}_{2})^{2n} \mapsto G_n$ such that

$\mathbf{N}(\mathbf{z} \vert \mathbf{x}) = N(z_1 \vert x_1) \otimes \cdots \otimes N(z_n \vert x_n).$

Similar to the single-qubit case, denoting the quotient group $G_n / \{\pm 1, \pm i\}$ as $[G_n]$, the map $[\mathbf{N}] : (\mathbb{Z}_{2})^{2n} \mapsto [G_n]$ is an isomorphism:

$[\mathbf{N}(\mathbf{u} + \mathbf{v})] = [\mathbf{N}(\mathbf{u})][\mathbf{N}(\mathbf{v})].$

Furthermore, for $\mathbf{u} = \mathbf{z} \vert \mathbf{x}$ and $\mathbf{v} = \mathbf{z}' \vert \mathbf{x}'$, where $\mathbf{z}, \mathbf{x}, \mathbf{z}', \mathbf{x}' \in (\mathbb{Z}_{2})^n$, define the symplectic product $\odot$ as

$\mathbf{u}\odot\mathbf{v} \equiv \sum_{i=1}^{n}z_{i}x_{i}'-x_{i} z_{i}' = \sum_{i=1}^{n}u_{i}\odot v_{i},$

where $u_{i} = z_{i} \vert x_{i}$ and $v_{i} = z_{i}' \vert x_{i}'$. Then the symplectic product captures the commutation relations of any operators $\mathbf{N}(\mathbf{u})$ and $\mathbf{N}(\mathbf{v})$:

$\mathbf{N}(\mathbf{u})\mathbf{N}(\mathbf{v}) = (-1)^{(\mathbf{u}\odot\mathbf{v}) }\mathbf{N}(\mathbf{v})\mathbf{N}(\mathbf{u}).$

The above binary representation and symplectic algebra are especially useful in making the relation between classical linear error correction and quantum stabilizer codes more explicit. In the language of symplectic vector spaces, a symplectic subspace corresponds to a direct sum of Pauli algebras (i.e., encoded qubits), while an isotropic subspace corresponds to a set of stabilizers.
