= Electron bubble =

An electron bubble is the empty space created around a free electron in a cryogenic gas or liquid, such as neon or helium. They are typically very small, about 2 nm in diameter at atmospheric pressure.

== Electron bubbles in helium ==
At room temperature, electrons in noble gases move about freely, limited only by collisions with the weakly interacting atoms. Their mobility, which depends on the gas density and temperature, is well described by classical kinetic theory. As the temperature is lowered, the electron mobility decreases, since the helium atoms slow down at lower temperature and do not interact with the electron as often.

Below a critical temperature, the mobility of the electrons drops quickly to a value much below what is expected classically. This discrepancy led to the development of the electron bubble theory. At low temperatures, electrons injected into liquid helium do not move freely as one might expect, but rather form small vacuum bubbles around themselves.

== Electron repulsion from the surface of helium ==
Electrons are attracted to liquid helium due to the difference in dielectric constants between the gas and liquid phase of helium. The negative electron polarizes the helium at the surface, leading to an image charge which binds it to the surface. The electron is forbidden from entering the liquid for the same reason hydrogen atoms are stable: quantum mechanics. The electron and image charge form a bound state, just as an electron and proton do in a hydrogen atom, with a minimum average separation. In this case, the minimum energy is about 1 eV (a moderate amount of energy on an atomic scale)[3].

When an electron is forced into liquid helium rather than floating on its surface, it forms a bubble rather than entering the liquid. The size of this bubble is determined by three main factors (ignoring small corrections): the confinement term, the surface tension term, and the pressure-volume term. The confinement term is purely quantum mechanical, since whenever an electron is tightly confined, its kinetic energy goes up. The surface tension term represents the surface energy of the liquid helium; this is exactly like water and all other liquids. The pressure-volume term is the amount of energy needed to push the helium out of the bubble.[4]

$$E \approx \frac{h^2}{8 m R^2} + 4\pi R^2\alpha + \frac{4}{3}\pi R^3P$$

Here E is the energy of the bubble, h is the Planck constant, m is the electron mass, R is the bubble radius, α is the surface energy, and P is the ambient pressure.

== 2S electron bubble ==
A theoretical prediction has been made based on the analysis of the equation above,[5] that the 2S electron bubble exhibits a startling morphological instability under a wide range of ambient pressures. While its wave function is spherical, the stable shape of the bubble is nonspherical.

== Footnotes ==
- 1. G. Ramanan and Gordon R. Freeman (1990). "Electron Mobilities in Low Density Helium and Nitrogen Gases". Journal of Chemical Physics. 93 (5): 3120. Bibcode:1990JChPh..93.3120R. doi:10.1063/1.459675.
- 2. C. G. Kuper (1961). "Theory of Negative Ions in Liquid Helium". Physical Review. 122 (4): 1007–1011. Bibcode:1961PhRv..122.1007K. doi:10.1103/PhysRev.122.1007.
- 3. W. T. Sommer (1964). "Liquid Helium as a Barrier to Electrons". Physical Review Letters. 12 (11): 271–273. Bibcode:1964PhRvL..12..271S. doi:10.1103/PhysRevLett.12.271.
- 4. M. A. Woolf and G. W. Rayfield (1965). "Energy of Negative Ions in Liquid Helium by Photoelectric Emission". Physical Review Letters. 15 (6): 235. Bibcode:1965PhRvL..15..235W. doi:10.1103/PhysRevLett.15.235.
- 5. P. Grinfeld and H. Kojima (2003). "Instability of the 2S Electron Bubbles". Physical Review Letters. 91 (10) 105301. Bibcode:2003PhRvL..91j5301G. doi:10.1103/PhysRevLett.91.105301. PMID 14525485.
