= QCL =

QCL may refer to:

- Air Class Líneas Aéreas (ICAO Code: QCL)
- Queen's College, London
- Queensland Cement and Lime Company, a building material manufacturer in Australia
- Quantum cascade laser
- Quantum Computation Language
