= Electron-on-helium qubit =

Quantum bit

An electron-on-helium qubit is a quantum bit for which the orthonormal basis states |0⟩ and |1⟩ are defined by quantized motional states or alternatively the spin states of an electron trapped above the surface of liquid helium. The electron-on-helium qubit was proposed as the basic element for building quantum computers with electrons on helium by Platzman and Dykman in 1999.

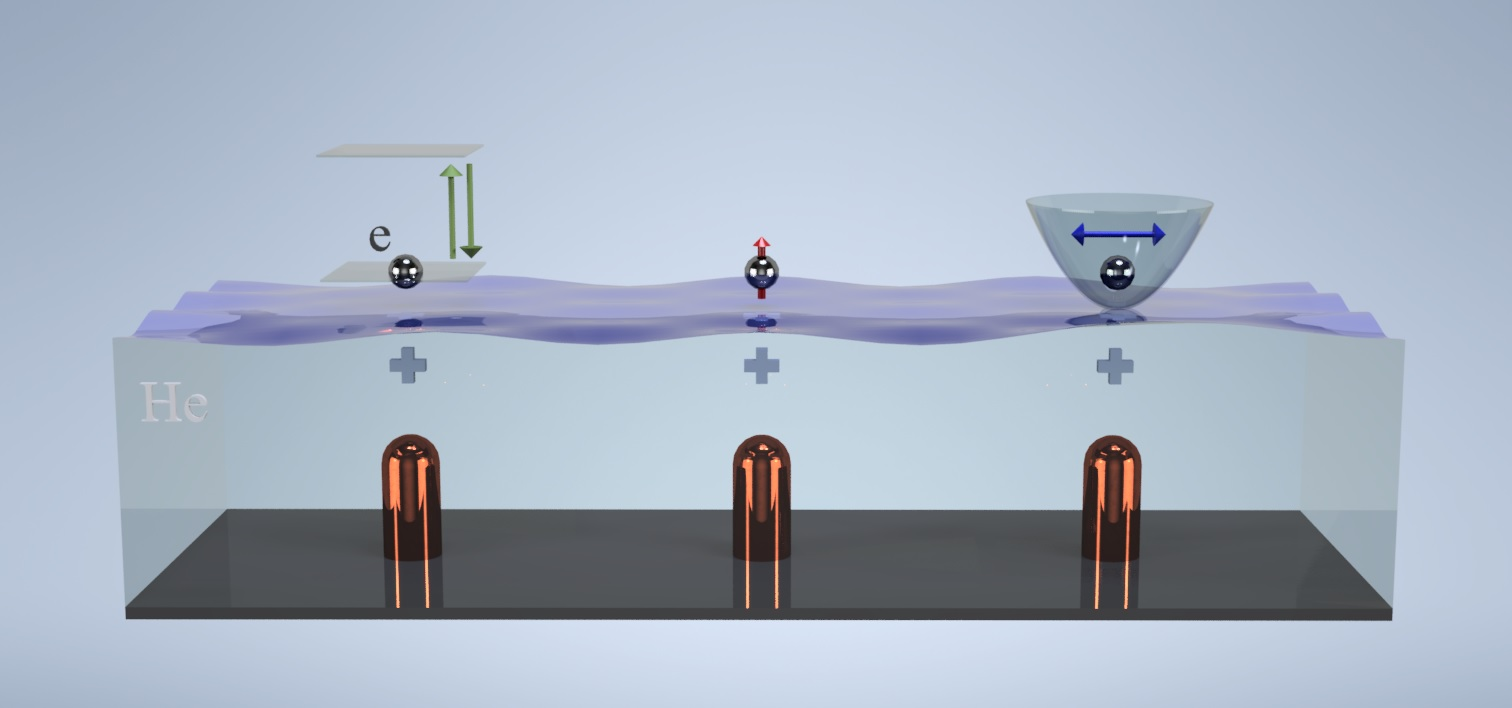
Schematic illustration of electron-on-helium qubits. The Rydberg (left), spin (centre) and orbital (right) degrees of freedom have been proposed as basis states for quantum computing.

== History of electrons on helium ==
The electrostrictive binding of electrons to the surface of liquid helium was first demonstrated experimentally by Bruschi and co-workers in 1966. A theoretical treatment of the electron-helium interaction was developed by Cole and Cohen in 1969 and, independently, by Shikin in 1970. An electron close to the surface of liquid helium experiences an attractive force due to the formation of a weak (~0.01e) image charge in the dielectric liquid. However, the electron is prevented from entering the liquid by a high (~1 eV) barrier formed at the surface due to the hard-core repulsion of the electron by the helium atoms. As a result, the electron remains trapped outside the liquid. The energy of the electron in this potential well is quantised in a Hydrogen-like series with the modified Rydberg constant R_{He} $\approx$ 10^{−4} R_{H}. The binding energies of the ground (n = 1) and first excited (n = 2) states are -7.6 K and -1.9 K respectively and, as the energy required for excitation is higher than the typical experimental temperature ($\lesssim$1 K), the electron remains in the ground state, trapped several nanometres above the liquid surface. The first spectroscopic evidence for these surface states was presented by Grimes and co-workers in 1976.

The electron motion parallel to the helium surface is free and, as the surface is free of impurities, the electron can move across the helium with record-high mobility. The liquid surface can support electron densities up to an electrohydrodynamic limit of 2.4 billion/cm^{2}, much lower than those typically achieved in semiconductor two-dimensional electron gases. For such low densities the electron system is described by nondegenerate statistics and, because the Coulomb interaction between electrons is only weakly screened by the helium, the spatial position of an electron in the 2D layer is strongly correlated with that of its neighbours. At low temperatures (typically below 1 K) the Coulomb interaction energy overcomes the electron thermal energy and the electrons form a 2D triangular lattice, the classical Wigner solid. The surface density can be increased towards the degenerate Fermi regime on thin helium films covering solid substrates, or on other cryogenic substrates that exhibit a negative electron affinity such as solid hydrogen or neon, although measurements on these substrates are typically hindered by surface roughness.

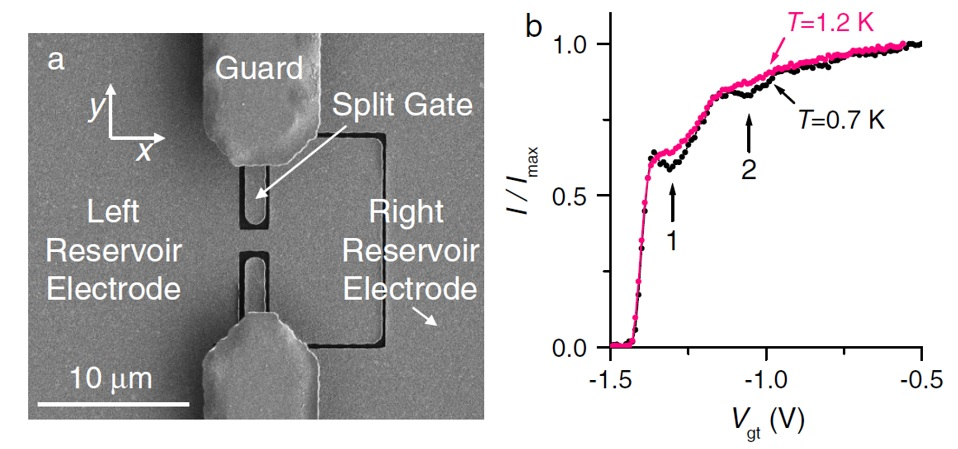
a) Split-gate device for electrons on helium used to measure single electron transport. Surface electrons move from the left microchannel reservoir to the right microchannel reservoir through a constriction formed by a split-gate electrode. (b) At low temperatures, classical electron ordering effects give rise to current plateaus corresponding to 1, 2... electrons passing side-by-side through the constriction.

Since the 1970s, electrons on helium have been used to study the properties of 2D electron liquids and solids, as well as the liquid helium (^{4}He or ^{3}He) substrate. Notable areas of research include collective electron excitations and edge magnetoplasmon effects, many-body transport phenomena and Kosterlitz-Thouless melting in 2D, polaronic effects at the helium interface, the observation of microwave-induced zero-resistance states and incompressible states in the nondegenerate electron gas, and the mapping of the texture of superfluid ^{3}He via interactions between the electron solid and quasiparticle excitations in the superfluid. In recent years, micrometer-scale helium channels with sub-surface gate electrodes have been used to create devices in which single surface-state electrons can be manipulated, facilitating the integration of electrons on helium with semiconductor device architectures and superconducting circuits.

== Proposed quantum computing schemes – Rydberg, spin and orbital states ==
In the Platzman and Dykman proposal, the ground and first excited Rydberg energy levels of electrons, trapped above electrodes submerged under the helium surface, were proposed as the qubit basis states. The intrinsic low temperature of the system allowed the straightforward preparation of the qubit in the ground state. Qubit operations were performed via the excitation of the Rydberg transition with resonant microwave fields at frequencies ~120 GHz. Qubit interactions were facilitated by the long-range Coulomb interaction between electrons. Qubit read-out was achieved by the selective ionisation of excited electrons from the helium surface. In 2000, Lea and co-authors proposed that the qubit read-out could be achieved using a single electron transistor (SET) device positioned beneath the helium.

In 2006, Lyon proposed that the spin state of an electron on helium could also be used as a qubit. A CCD-like architecture was proposed for the control of the many-qubit system with dipole-dipole interaction allowing two-qubit gate operations for adjacent spins. A global magnetic field parallel to the helium surface provided the axis for spin excitation, with local magnetic fields applied by submerged conductors used to bring the spins into resonance with microwave fields for qubit excitation. Exchange interaction for adjacent qubits was proposed as a read-out scheme, as demonstrated in semiconductor double-quantum-dot devices.

In 2010 Schuster and co-workers proposed that for an electron in a lateral trapping potential the orbital states for motion parallel to the helium surface could be used as qubit basis states. The electron trap was integrated into a superconducting coplanar cavity device. It was shown that, as in many superconducting qubit systems, the resonant exchange of microwave photons between the trapped electron and the cavity could be described by the Jaynes-Cummings Hamiltonian. Distant qubits could be coupled via a cavity bus. It was also shown that local magnetic field gradients could allow coupling between the electron spin state and the lateral motion, facilitating the read-out of the spin state via microwave spectroscopy of the cavity.

== Decoherence ==
In any quantum computer the decoherence of the qubit wavefunction, due to energy relaxation or dephasing effects, must be limited to a suitably low rate. For electron-on-helium qubits, deformations of the helium surface due to surface or bulk excitations (ripplons or phonons) modify the image charge potential and distort the electron wavefunction. Therefore, for Rydberg and orbital states, the primary source of decoherence is expected to be the emission of ripplons or phonons in the helium substrate. However, the decay rate due to these processes is expected to be slow (~100 μs) compared with the rate at which qubit operations can be performed (~10 ns). For the spin state, the inherent purity of the qubit environment and the weak spin orbit interaction for an electron moving above the helium surface results in predicted coherence times $>$1 s.

== Current developments ==
The first trapping and detection of single electrons on helium was demonstrated by Lea and co-workers in 2005, using a micrometer-scale helium-filled trap and a single electron transistor beneath the surface to count the electrons. This experiment also demonstrated the first coupling between an electron on helium and a superconducting quantum circuit. Subsequently, other experiments have demonstrated progress towards the coherent control of single electrons on helium. These include ultra-efficient electron clocking in microchannel CCD devices, controlled single electron transport measurements, and the trapping and manipulation of 1D electron arrays, In 2019, Koolstra and co-workers at the University of Chicago demonstrated the coupling of a single electron on helium to a superconducting microwave cavity, with a coupling strength g/2π ~ 5 MHz much larger than the resonator linewidth ~0.5 MHz. In 2020, researchers from Michigan State University and EeroQ presented new results and fabrication progress on an electron-on-helium chip design using the lateral motional state of the electron, in frequencies in the 5–10 GHz range, using single-electron transistor readout devices. In 2026 researchers at EeroQ demonstrated strong coupling between a microwave frequency photon and the charge-qubit state of an electron on helium confined in a quantum dot structure.
