= Spectral gap conjecture =

Conjecture in ergodic theory

In ergodic theory, a branch of mathematics, the spectral gap conjecture of Alexander Lubotzky, Ralph S. Phillips, and Peter Sarnak is a statement on the spectral gaps of certain actions of a free group on the sphere $S^{2}$.

== Statement ==
Any matrix $U \in SU(2)$ defines an isometry of the sphere $S^{2}$, which in turn defines an operator $\phi_{U}$ on the Hilbert space $L^{2}(SU(2))$. The spectral gap conjecture states that for any integer $n > 2$, if $n$ isometries $U_{1}, \dots, U_{n}$ are chosen uniformly at random, then the operator $\phi_{U_{1}} + \phi_{U_{1}}^{-1} + \cdots + \phi_{U_{n}} + \phi_{U_{n}}^{-1}$ has a nontrivial spectral gap with probability 1.

== Progress ==
In 2007, Jean Bourgain and Alex Gamburd proved that when the matrices $U_{i}$ have entries which are all algebraic numbers up to simultaneous conjugation, the resulting operator has a spectral gap. This result was later generalized to the case of $SU(d)$. It is known that either there is a nontrivial spectral gap with probability 1 or that the spectral gap is trivial with probability 1. If true, the statement would have applications to quantum computing and the design of universal quantum gate sets.
