= Quantum register =

System comprising multiple qubits

In quantum computing, a quantum register is a system comprising multiple qubits. It is the quantum analogue of the classical hardware register. Quantum computers perform calculations by manipulating qubits within a quantum register.

== Definition ==
It is usually assumed that the register consists of qubits. It is also generally assumed that registers are not density matrices, but that they are pure, although the definition of "register" can be extended to density matrices.

An $n$ size quantum register is a quantum system comprising $n$ pure qubits.

The Hilbert space, $\mathcal{H}$, in which the data is stored in a quantum register is given by $\mathcal{H} = \mathcal{H_{n-1}}\otimes\mathcal{H_{n-2}}\otimes\ldots\otimes\mathcal{H_0}$ where $\otimes$ is the tensor product.

The number of dimensions of the Hilbert spaces depends on what kind of quantum systems the register is composed of. Qubits are 2-dimensional complex spaces ($\mathbb{C}^2$), while qutrits are 3-dimensional complex spaces ($\mathbb{C}^3$), etc. For a register composed of N number of d-dimensional (or d-level) quantum systems we have the Hilbert space $\mathcal{H}=(\mathbb{C}^d)^{\otimes N} = \underbrace{\mathbb{C}^d \otimes \mathbb{C}^d \otimes \dots \otimes \mathbb{C}^d }_{N\text{ times}} \cong \mathbb{C}^{d^N}.$

The registers quantum state vector $\psi$ of this $d^N$-dimensional Hilbert space can in the bra-ket notation be written as a linear combination of some set of orthogonal basis vectors labeled $|0\rangle$ to $|d^N-1\rangle,$ as $|\psi\rangle = \sum_{k=0}^{d^N-1} a_k|k\rangle = a_0|0\rangle + a_1|1\rangle + \dots + a_{d^N-1}|d^N-1\rangle.$ Such linear combinations are in quantum mechanics called superpositions and the values $a_k$ are probability amplitudes. Because of the Born rule and the 2nd axiom of probability theory, $\sum_{k=0}^{d^N-1} |a_k|^2 = 1,$ so the possible state space of the register is the surface of the unit sphere in $\mathbb{C}^{d^N}.$

Examples:

- The quantum state vector of a 5-qubit register is a unit vector in $\mathbb{C}^{2^5}=\mathbb{C}^{32}.$
- A register of four qutrits similarly is a unit vector in $\mathbb{C}^{3^4}=\mathbb{C}^{81}.$

== Quantum vs. classical register ==
There are both structural and functional differences between quantum and classical registers. Structurally, an $n$ size classical register is an array of $n$ flip flops, whereas an $n$ size quantum register is a collection of $n$ qubits. Functionally, an $n$ size classical register stores a single value of the $2^n$ possibilities spanned by $n$ bits, whereas a quantum register is able to simultaneously store all $2^n$ possibilities spanned by quantum pure qubits.

For example, consider a two-bit register. A classical register is able to store only one of the possible values represented by 2 bits - $00, 01, 10, 11 \quad(0, 1, 2, 3)$ accordingly.

If we consider two pure qubits in superpositions $|a_0\rangle=\frac{1}{\sqrt2}(|0\rangle + |1\rangle)$ and $|a_1\rangle=\frac{1}{\sqrt2}(|0\rangle - |1\rangle)$, using the quantum register definition $|a\rangle=|a_{0}\rangle\otimes|a_{1}\rangle = \frac{1}{2}(|00\rangle - |01\rangle + |10\rangle - |11\rangle)$ it follows that it is capable of storing all the possible values (by having non-zero probability amplitude for all outcomes) spanned by two qubits simultaneously.

== See also ==
- List of proposed quantum registers
- Quantum circuit
- Quantum logic gate
- Qudit
