= Raymond Laflamme =

Canadian theoretical physicist (1960–2025)

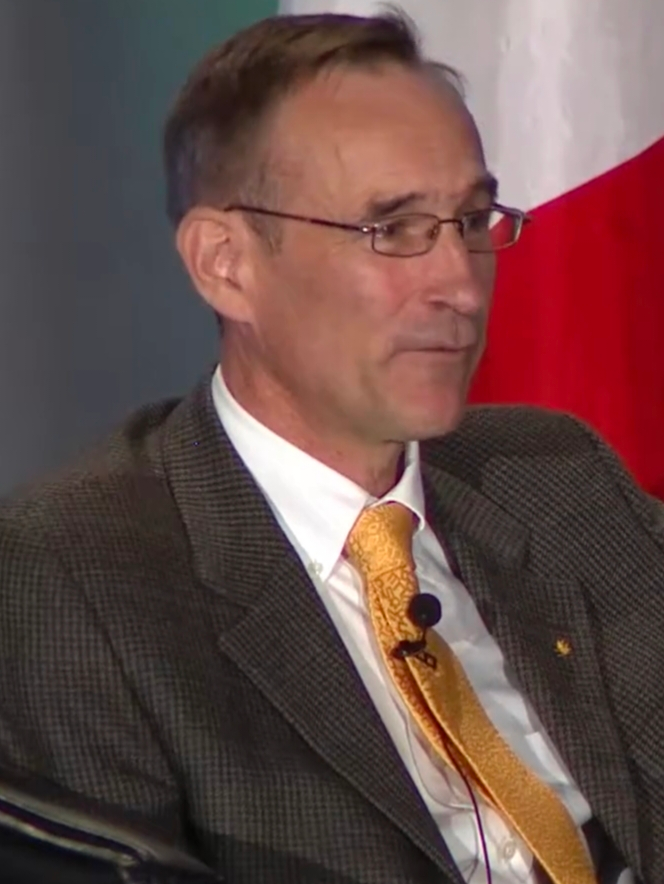
- Laflamme in 2016
- Born: Raymond Julien Joseph Laflamme; July 19, 1960; Quebec City, Quebec, Canada
- Died: June 19, 2025 (aged 64); Waterloo, Ontario, Canada
- Education: Université Laval; University of Cambridge
- Known for: Five-qubit error correcting code NMR quantum computing Linear optical quantum computing One clean qubit Gregory–Laflamme instability KLM protocol Knill–Laflamme conditions
- Awards: CAP-CRM Prize in Theoretical and Mathematical Physics
- Scientific career
- Fields: Theoretical physics Quantum information
- Workplaces: Institute for Quantum Computing; Los Alamos National Laboratory; University of Waterloo; Perimeter Institute for Theoretical Physics
- Thesis: Time and quantum cosmology (June 17, 1988)
- Doctoral advisor: Stephen Hawking

Raymond Julien Joseph Laflamme, OC FRSC (French: [ʁɛmɔ̃ ʒyljɛ̃ ʒozɛf laflam]; July 19, 1960 – June 19, 2025) was a Canadian theoretical physicist who was the founder and, until June 2017, the director of the Institute for Quantum Computing at the University of Waterloo. He was also a professor in the Department of Physics and Astronomy at the University of Waterloo and an associate faculty member at Perimeter Institute for Theoretical Physics. Laflamme was a Canada Research Chair in Quantum Information. In December 2017, he was named as one of the appointees to the Order of Canada.

As Stephen Hawking's PhD student, he first became famous for convincing Hawking that time does not reverse in a contracting universe, along with Don Page. Hawking told the story of how this happened in his famous book A Brief History of Time in the chapter The Arrow of Time. Later on, Laflamme made a name for himself in quantum computing and quantum information theory, which was what he later became famous for. In 2005, Laflamme's research group created the world's largest quantum information processor with 12 qubits. Along with Phillip Kaye and Michele Mosca, he published the book An Introduction to Quantum Computing in 2006. In 2024, he published the book Building Quantum Computers with Shayan Majidy and Christopher Wilson.

Laflamme's research focused on understanding the impact of manipulating information using the laws of quantum mechanics, the development of methods to protect quantum information against noise through quantum control and quantum error correction for quantum computing and cryptography, the implementation of ideas and concepts of quantum information processing using nuclear magnetic resonance to develop scalable methods of control of quantum systems, and the development of blueprints for quantum information processors such as linear optical quantum computing.

== Biography ==
Raymond Julien Joseph Laflamme was born on July 19, 1960, in Quebec City, to a medical doctor father and a dietician mother. He finished his undergraduate education at the Université Laval in Canada and went on to study at the Department of Applied Mathematics and Theoretical Physics at the University of Cambridge, where he received the Part III of the Mathematical Tripos degree in 1984. Subsequently, his PhD supervisor was Stephen Hawking. Hawking mentioned in his book A Brief History of Time that Laflamme and Don Page were responsible for convincing him that time does not reverse in a contracting universe. Hawking inscribed a copy of the book as follows: "To Raymond, who showed me that the arrow of time is not a boomerang. Thank you for all your help. Stephen."

After completing his PhD, Laflamme worked as a Killam Postdoctoral Fellow at the University of British Columbia and in 1990, moved back to Cambridge as a Research Fellow at Peterhouse, Cambridge. Laflamme subsequently joined the Los Alamos National Laboratory where he was an Oppenheimer Fellow. In 1998, quantum teleportation, including his work demonstrating the protocol with nuclear spins, was ranked amongst the Top Ten Breakthroughs of the Year by the journal Science. In 2001, he joined the newly founded Perimeter Institute for Theoretical Physics and the Physics and Astronomy department of the affiliated University of Waterloo, where he founded the Institute for Quantum Computing in 2002.

In 2003, he became director of the Quantum Information program at the Canadian Institute for Advanced Research; he was also the scientific director of QuantumWorks, Canada's national research consortium on quantum information science, and held the Canada Research Chair in Quantum Information.

In June 2017, Laflamme stepped down as director at the Institute for Quantum Computing and in September 2017, he was appointed the John von Neumann Chair in Quantum Information at the University of Waterloo, continuing his research on error correction in quantum systems. Laflamme continued to hold a Canada Research Chair and a position as Associate Faculty at Perimeter Institute.

Laflamme died from cancer in Waterloo, Ontario, on June 19, 2025, at the age of 64.

== Scientific work ==
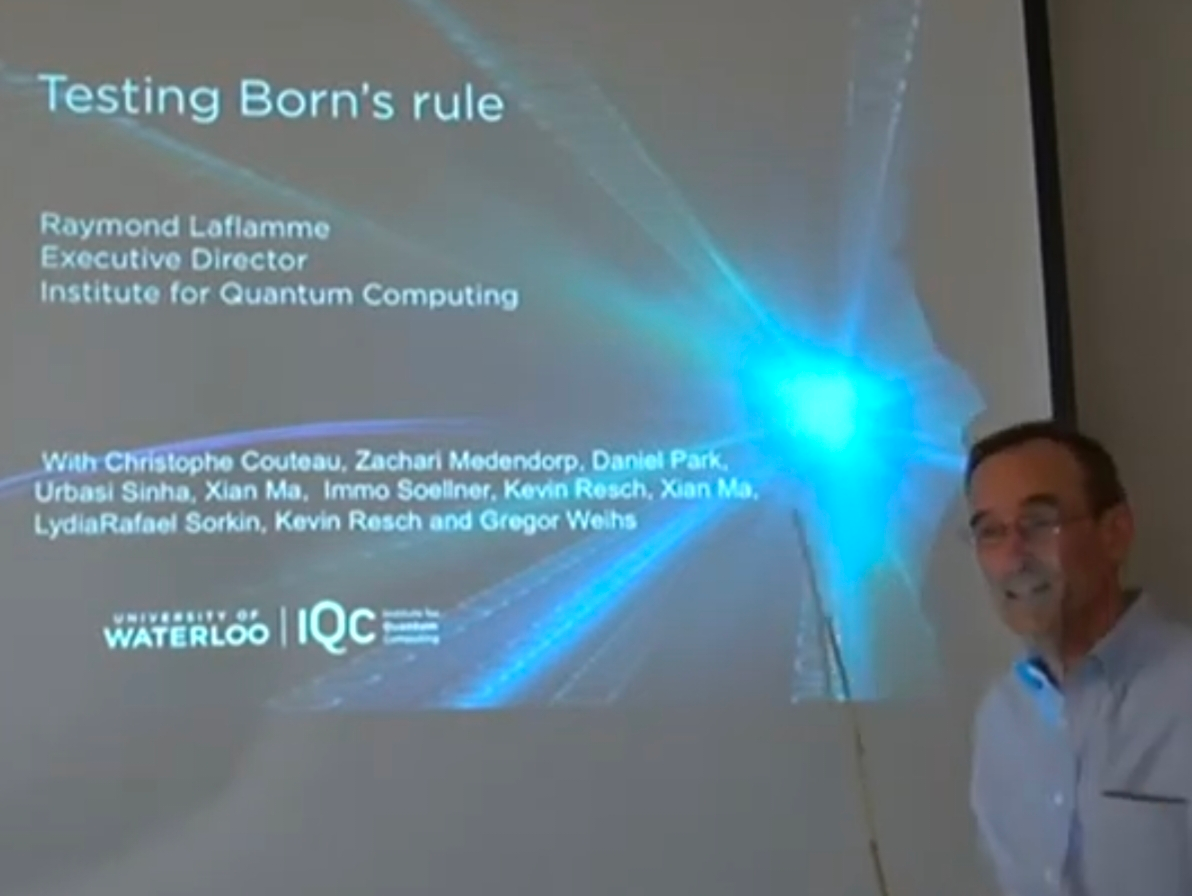
Laflamme in 2014, giving a lecture about Born rule

While Laflamme started his career working in quantum gravity and cosmology, he was known as a pioneering scientist in quantum information theory. While at Los Alamos, Laflamme was involved with the experimental implementation of quantum information processing devices using nuclear magnetic resonance.

Laflamme laid down the mathematical framework for quantum error-correcting codes, which has since developed into a broad topic of research. With colleagues Cesar Miquel, Juan Pablo Paz and Wojciech H. Zurek, he constructed the most compact quantum error correcting code.

Two of his important and highly cited works were concerned with the computational power of a restricted set of states or operations. In joint work with Emanuel Knill, he defined a quantum computational model of one clean qubit (DQC1) where a universal set of quantum gates is available, but all but one qubit are in a maximally mixed state. This model defines a complexity class which is thought to be intermediate between classical computation (BPP) and full quantum computing (BQP): it can solve efficiently some problems that are thought to be classically hard, but believed to be strictly weaker than BQP.

Together with Knill and Gerard J. Milburn, he showed that linear optics, together with photon-counting measurements and feed-forward, allow for efficient universal quantum computation when acting on a suitable multi-photon Fock state as initial state (KLM protocol). This was an important result for optics-based approaches to quantum computing since it obviates the need to implement direct photon-photon interactions and laid the foundations for Linear optical quantum computing and, as a restriction of the KLM-model, to boson sampling.

According to Scopus, Laflamme had an h-index of 59 as of July 2025, with over 200 articles in scientific journals cited more than 24,000 times.

In a 2013 interview, Laflamme described the importance of his work as follows: "Quantum information is going to change your life. And the one of your kids. And the one of your grandkids. And this is what I want to see. And this is what I expect to see: before I pass away, I will see that this quantum revolution is in full swing."

== Awards and honours ==
- Glory of the Escolle Medal in 2005 – awarded by the Université Laval Alumni Association to "honor former graduates for their exceptional contribution[s] to their profession and society."
- Fellow of the Royal Society of Canada in 2008
- Ontario Premier's Discovery Award in the field of Natural Sciences and Engineering in 2008
- Fellow of the American Physical Society in 2011
- Fellow of the American Association for the Advancement of Science in 2011
- Honorary degree from Université de Sherbrooke in 2012
- Queen Elizabeth II Golden Jubilee Medal in 2013
- Awarded the CAP-CRM Prize in Theoretical and Mathematical Physics in 2017
- Appointed to the Order of Canada in 2017 "for his outstanding achievements as an administrator and researcher who has advanced quantum science and technology in Canada"; invested in 2019.
- Honoured posthumously by the IYQ 2025, with the Wyoming-based publication Quantum Zeitgeist writing: "... [T]he remembrance of Professor Laflamme emphasize[s] the importance of community in quantum science. ... Through textbooks and national initiatives, [Laflamme] helped shape generations of quantum researchers, propelling the global quantum ecosystem forward, supported by IYQ’s partner, TFD."
- After his death, The Perimeter Institute established the Raymond Laflamme Postdoctoral Fellowship in his honour, with an initial US$1,000,000 matching commitment.
- In December 2025, The Perimeter Institute opened applications for the Ray Laflamme Early Career Chair in Quantum Computing and Quantum Information (a position equivalent to assistant professor in quantum information science) named after Laflamme.

== Media appearances ==
Laflamme was a featured scientist in the award-winning documentary, The Quantum Tamers which was presented by the Perimeter Institute and saw its Canadian premiere in October 2009 at the Quantum to Cosmos festival in Waterloo, Ontario. Laflamme was also a participant in The Agenda With Steve Paikin discussion panel, "Wired 24/7", with Neil Gershenfeld, Jaron Lanier, Neal Stephenson, and Tara Hunt which took place at the festival. The following year, Laflamme was a contributor at the 2010 TEDx event, also in Waterloo, Ontario.

Laflamme was involved in several events surrounding the grand-opening of the Mike & Ophelia Lazaridis Quantum-Nano Centre at the University of Waterloo. He was a participant at the "Bridging Worlds" panel discussion with Ivan Semeniuk, Mike Lazaridis, Thomas Brzustowski, and Chad Orzel at the Mike & Ophelia Lazaridis Quantum-Nano Centre Open House in 2012.

As part of the grand-opening events, the Kitchener–Waterloo Symphony performed "Quantum: Music at the Frontier of Science" of which Laflamme was a collaborator in the creation of the concert narrative.

Laflamme appeared as a speaker at BrainSTEM: Your Future is Now festival which ran from September 30 to October 6, 2013.

== Selected publications ==
- Gregory, Ruth; Laflamme, Raymond (May 10, 1993). "Black Strings and p-Branes are Unstable". Physical Review Letters. 70 (19): 2837–2840. arXiv:hep-th/9301052. Bibcode:1993PhRvL..70.2837G. doi:10.1103/PhysRevLett.70.2837. PMID 10053666.
- Gregory, Ruth; Laflamme, Raymond (October 10, 1994). "The Instability of Charged Black Strings and p-Branes". Nuclear Physics B. 428 (1–2): 399–434. arXiv:hep-th/9404071. Bibcode:1994NuPhB.428..399G. doi:10.1016/0550-3213(94)90206-2.
- Knill, Emanuel; Laflamme, Raymond (April 26, 1996). "A Theory of Quantum Error-Correcting Codes". Physical Review Letters. 84 (11): 2525–2528. arXiv:quant-ph/9604034. Bibcode:2000PhRvL..84.2525K. doi:10.1103/PhysRevLett.84.2525. PMID 11018926.
- Laflamme, Raymond; Miquel, Cesar; Paz, Juan Pablo; Zurek, Wojciech H (July 1, 1996). "Perfect quantum error-correcting code". Physical Review Letters. 77 (1): 198–201. arXiv:quant-ph/9602019. Bibcode:1996quant.ph..2019L. doi:10.1103/PhysRevLett.77.198. PMID 10061806.
- Nielsen, Michael Aaron; Knill, Emanuel; Laflamme, Raymond (November 5, 1998). "Complete quantum teleportation using nuclear magnetic resonance". Nature. 396 (6706): 52–55. arXiv:quant-ph/9811020. Bibcode:1998Natur.396...52N. doi:10.1038/23891.
- Knill, Emanuel; Zurek, Wojciech H.; Laflamme, Raymond (January 16, 1998). "Resilient quantum computation". Science. 279 (5349): 342–345. Bibcode:1998Sci...279..342K. doi:10.1126/science.279.5349.342.
- Knill, Emanuel; Laflamme, Raymond (December 21, 1998). "On the Power of One Bit of Quantum Information". Physical Review Letters. 81 (25): 5672. arXiv:quant-ph/9802037. Bibcode:1998PhRvL..81.5672K. doi:10.1103/PhysRevLett.81.5672.
- Knill, Emanuel; Laflamme, Raymond; Viola, Lorenza (March 13, 2000). "Theory of quantum error correction for general noise". Physical Review Letters. 84 (11): 2525–2528. arXiv:quant-ph/9604034. Bibcode:2000PhRvL..84.2525K. doi:10.1103/PhysRevLett.84.2525. PMID 11018926.
- Knill, Emanuel; Laflamme, Raymond; Milburn, Gerard (January 4, 2001). "A scheme for efficient quantum computation with linear optics". Nature. 409 (6816): 46–52. Bibcode:2001Natur.409...46K. doi:10.1038/35051009. PMID 11343107.
- Knill, Emanuel; Laflamme, Raymond; Martinez, Reynaldo; Negrevergne, Camille (June 18, 2001). "Benchmarking Quantum Computers: The Five-Qubit Error Correcting Code". Physical Review Letters. 86 (25). American Physical Society: 5811–5814. arXiv:quant-ph/0101034. Bibcode:2001PhRvL..86.5811K. doi:10.1103/PhysRevLett.86.5811. PMID 11415364.
- Knill, Emanuel; Laflamme, Raymond; Ashikhmin, Alexei; Barnum, Howard; Lorenza, Viola; Zurek, Wojciech H. (July 30, 2002). "Introduction to quantum error correction". Los Alamos Science (27). arXiv:quant-ph/0207170. Bibcode:2002quant.ph..7170K.
- Somma, Rolando D.; Ortiz, Gerardo; Gubernatis, James E.; Knill, Emanuel; Laflamme, Raymond (April 9, 2002). "Simulating physical phenomena by quantum networks". Physical Review A. 65 (4) 042323. arXiv:quant-ph/0108146. Bibcode:2002PhRvA..65d2323S. doi:10.1103/PhysRevA.65.042323.
- Kaye, Phillip; Laflamme, Raymond; Mosca, Michele (November 12, 2006). An Introduction to Quantum Computing. Oxford University Press. ISBN 9780198570004.
- Sinha, Urbasi; Couteau, Christophe; Medendorp, Zachari; Söllner, Immo; Laflamme, Raymond; Sorkin, Rafael; Weihs, Gregor; Accardi, Luigi; Adenier, Guillaume; Fuchs, Christopher; Jaeger, Gregg; Khrennikov, Andrei Yu.; Larsson, Jan-Åke; Stenholm, Stig (2009) [November 13, 2008]. "Testing Born's Rule in Quantum Mechanics with a Triple Slit Experiment". AIP Conference Proceedings. 1101 (1): 200–207. arXiv:0811.2068. Bibcode:2009AIPC.1101..200S. doi:10.1063/1.3109942. OCLC 45060072.
- Sinha, Urbasi; Couteau, Christophe; Jennewein, Thomas; Laflamme, Raymond; Weihs, Gregor (July 1, 2010) [July 23, 2010]. "Ruling out multi-order interference in quantum mechanics". Science. 329 (5990): 418–421. arXiv:1007.4193. Bibcode:2010Sci...329..418S. doi:10.1126/science.1190545. ISSN 0036-8075. PMID 20651147. Zbl 1226.81016.
- Kop, Mauritz; Aboy, Mateo; De Jong, Eline; Gasser, Urs; Minssen, Timo; Cohen, I. Glenn; Brongersma, Mark L.; Quintel, Teresa; Floridi, Luciano; Laflamme, Raymond (April 22, 2024). "Ten principles for responsible quantum innovation". Quantum Science and Technology. 9 (3): 035013. Bibcode:2024QS&T....9c5013K. doi:10.1088/2058-9565/ad3776. hdl:11245.1/99eb66de-c086-49dc-ba00-1e96a4893c7a.
- Majidy, Shayan; Wilson, Christopher; Laflamme, Raymond (September 30, 2024). Building Quantum Computers. Cambridge University Press. ISBN 9781009417013.
