= Natalia Korolkova =

British-Russian physicist and academic

- Education: Moscow State University
- Scientific career
- Workplaces: University of St Andrews; University of Erlangen; Palacky University

Natalia Korolkova is a British Russian physicist and Professor at the University of St Andrews. She works in theoretical physics and quantum information science, and the development of novel routes to scale up quantum computing.

== Early life and education ==
Korolkova earned her doctorate in theoretical quantum optics at Moscow State University. She was a postdoctoral researcher at the Palacky University. In 1997 she moved to the University of Erlangen as a Humboldt Fellow. She completed her habilitation in quantum information at the University of Erlangen.

== Research and career ==
Korolkova is interested in the quantum properties of laser pulses and warm atomic clouds. She studies continuous variable quantum information. By encoding quantum information into the spins of atoms and quadratures of light modes it is possible to deterministically generate and manipulate entangled states of light and atomic ensembles. She has explored non-Gaussian operations, entanglement distillation and continuous variable quantum computing.

Korolkova has developed protocols for quantum optics experiments. These protocols used classical communication channels to coordinate displacements between correlated light beams. Her work demonstrated the interplay between classical and quantum correlations in situations with more than two photon beams, which is useful for quantum networking.

She is part of the European Quantum Flagship, where she is contributing to understanding of coherent diffusive photonics. She will create new quantum sources for entanglement-enhanced imaging and atomic clocks. This will involve the generation of integrated waveguides.

== Awards and honours ==
- 1997 Alexander von Humboldt Research Fellowship
- 2015 E. Lommel Award in Modern Optical Technologies

== Select publications ==
- Ch. Silberhorn; P. K. Lam; O. Weiß; F. König; N. Korolkova; G. Leuchs (1 May 2001). "Generation of continuous variable Einstein-Podolsky-Rosen entanglement via the Kerr nonlinearity in an optical fiber". Physical Review Letters. 86 (19): 4267–4270. arXiv:quant-ph/0103002. Bibcode:2001PhRvL..86.4267S. doi:10.1103/physrevlett.86.4267. ISSN 0031-9007. PMID 11328151. Wikidata Q73818442.
- Natalia Korolkova; Gerd Leuchs; Rodney Loudon; Timothy C. Ralph; Christine Silberhorn (17 April 2002). "Polarization squeezing and continuous-variable polarization entanglement". Physical Review A. 65 (5). arXiv:quant-ph/0108098. Bibcode:2002PhRvA..65e2306K. doi:10.1103/physreva.65.052306. ISSN 2469-9926. Wikidata Q58923884.
- Ch. Silberhorn; N. Korolkova; Gerd Leuchs (8 April 2002). "Quantum key distribution with bright entangled beams". Physical Review Letters. 88 (16) 167902. arXiv:quant-ph/0109009. Bibcode:2002PhRvL..88p7902S. doi:10.1103/physrevlett.88.167902. ISSN 0031-9007. PMID 11955266. Wikidata Q58923882.
