= DQC =

DQC or .DQC can refer to:

- Driver Qualification Card, a card issued to new drivers passing the qualification test; see Driver CPC
- Data Quality Campaign, an American organization focused on data quality
- .DQC, a file format for documents compressed by SQ (program)
- Dynamic Quantum Clustering, a type of quantum clustering in data analysis
- Ormyridae, a family of parasitic wasps

== See also ==
- DQC1, the complexity class of problems that can be solved in the One Clean Qubit model of quantum computing
