= Silberhorn (surname) =

Silberhorn is a German language surname. Notable people with the name include:

- Christine Silberhorn (1974), German physicist
- Thomas Silberhorn (1968), German lawyer and politician
