= International Year of Quantum Science and Technology =

United Nations observance in 2025

International Year of Quantum Science and Technology 2025
- International Year of Quantum logo
- Date: 1 January – 31 December 2025
- Type: Exhibitions
- Website: quantum2025.org

The International Year of Quantum Science and Technology (IYQ) was a United Nations observance in 2025 that aimed to highlight the contributions of quantum science and practical applications of quantum technology. It was celebrated in the hundredth anniversary of the reformulation of quantum mechanics by Werner Heisenberg.

== Organization ==
The United Nations has a long history of pronouncing celebratory International Years. IYQ "began as a grassroots movement" commemorating the centennial anniversary of Heisenberg's Umdeutung paper, published in 1925. A number of professional societies and other organizations joined and supported the effort to name 2025 the International Year of Quantum and, at the May 2023 UNESCO Executive Board meeting, a resolution, co-sponsored by 59 countries, to “welcome and endorse the recommendation to proclaim 2025 international year of quantum science and technology . . . [and] recommend that the General Conference at its 42nd session adopts a resolution in this regard.” This 42nd session of the UNESCO General Conference convened in November of that year and passed a resolution recommending “that the General Assembly of the United Nations, at its seventy-eighth or seventy-ninth session, adopt a resolution declaring 2025 the international year of quantum science and technology.”

In May 2024, the United Nations General Assembly (UNGA) delegation from Ghana officially submitted an IYQ resolution at the 78th session of the UN in New York. The IYQ resolution was presented to the full General Assembly on June 7 by the Ghanaian delegation. The resolution was adopted by the UNGA without objection (“by acclamation”) and was co-sponsored by over 70 countries representing over 5 billion people.

The UN resolution “Decides to proclaim 2025 as the International Year of Quantum Science and Technology” and “recommends that the International Year of Quantum Science and Technology should be observed through activities at all levels aimed at increasing public awareness of the importance of quantum science and applications.”

IYQ is coordinated by the IYQ Secretariat convened by UNESCO and the American Physical Society. Principles articulated as part of the mission of IYQ include "No One Owns Quantum Science" and "Everyone is Invited." In particular, UNESCO has articulated the importance of developing quantum science equitably with respect to the growing disparity between the global north and global south.

== Opening ceremony and activities ==
The International Year of Quantum opening ceremony was held in Paris, France in February to officially launch the year-long celebration. The event was held February 4–5, 2025, at UNESCO Headquarters.

Throughout the year, IYQ celebrants were invited to host and share grassroots activities via the IYQ website. Over 500 events were registered, with many events featured as "Global Events," including the official IYQ closing ceremony held in Ghana in February 2026.

=== Helgoland 2025 ===
From 9 to 14 June, about 300 scientists traveled to Heligoland, Germany, the island where Heisenberg wrote his paper. The conference included 31 lectures, five panel debates and more than 100 posters. Participants included Alain Aspect, Markus Aspelmeyer, Philip Ball, Charles H. Bennett, Rainer Blatt, Gilles Brassard, Isaac Chuang, Ignacio Cirac, John Clauser, Aashish Clerk, Elise Crull, Nathalie de Leon, Michel Devoret, Christopher A. Fuchs, Nicolas Gisin, Lucien Hardy, Serge Haroche, Aram Harrow, Vedika Khemani, Gerd Leuchs, Mikhail Lukin, Juan Maldacena, Chiara Marletto, Nergis Mavalvala, Gerard J. Milburn, David C. Moore, Tracy Northup, Jianwei Pan (pre-recorded lecture), Sandu Popescu, John Preskill, Cindy Regal, Renato Renner, Ana Maria Rey, Carlo Rovelli, Monika Schleier-Smith, Robert J. Schoelkopf, Christine Silberhorn, Michelle Simmons, Robert Spekkens, A. Douglas Stone, W. G. Unruh, Umesh Vazirani, Reinhard F. Werner, David J. Wineland, Jun Ye, Anton Zeilinger, Peter Zoller and Wojciech H. Zurek. Organizers included Časlav Brukner, Steven Girvin and Jack Harris. A debate panel discussed the upcoming 100 years of quantum technologies.

=== Quantum Century Exhibition ===
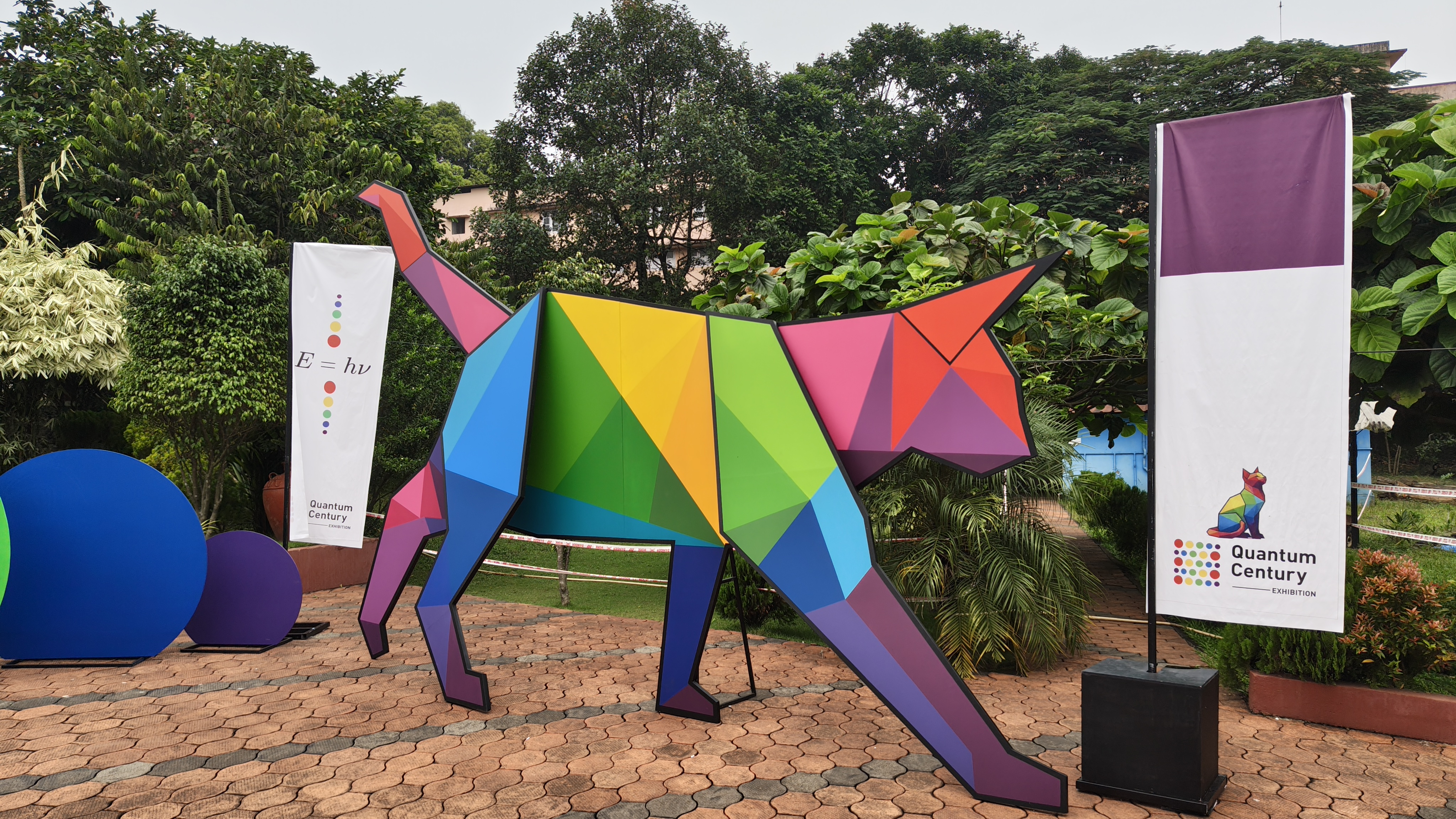
Quantum Century Exhibition Entrance at Cochin University of Science and Technology

As part of the regional grassroots initiatives for the International Year of Quantum Science and Technology, a major statewide educational outreach campaign called the Quantum Century Exhibition was organized in Kerala, India. Launched on November 7, 2025, the travelling exhibition aimed to simplify complex quantum phenomena and make quantum history, current breakthroughs, and future technologies accessible to the general public, students, and educators.

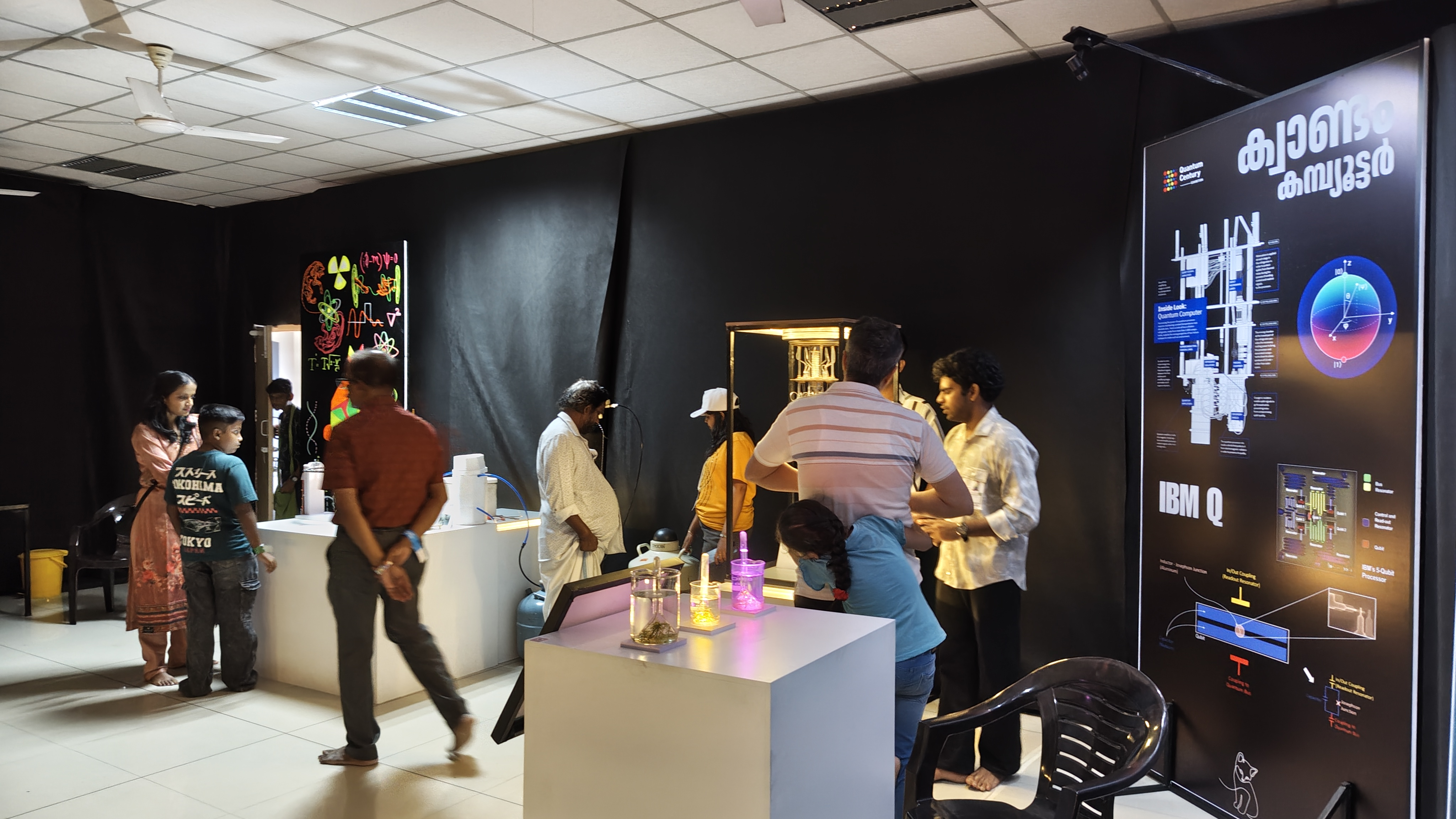
Exhibition hall at Cochin University of Science and Technology

The initiative was jointly coordinated by the Kerala Sasthra Sahithya Parishad (KSSP) through its science communication portal LUCA, the Centre for Science in Society (C-SiS) at Cochin University of Science and Technology (CUSAT), and the Curiefy Science Lab. The exhibition kicked off its statewide tour from its primary host venue at CUSAT in Kochi.

To ensure the long-term open access and preservation of the educational assets used during the event, the Wikimedians of Kerala User Group launched a multimedia documentation campaign on Wikimedia Commons called the Quantum Century Exhibition 2025 Campaign.
