= Del'Haye =

Del'Haye is a surname. Notable people with the surname include:

- Karl Del'Haye (born 1955), German footballer
- Pascal Del'Haye, German physicist
- R. A. Del'Haye (1889–1944), Canadian World War I flying ace

== See also ==
- Delahaye (surname)
