= Ruth Gregory =

British physicist

- Education: University of Cambridge (PhD)
- Known for: Gregory–Laflamme instability
- Awards: Maxwell Medal and Prize (2006); Royal Society Wolfson Research Merit Award (2011)
- Scientific career
- Fields: Mathematical physics; Theoretical physics
- Workplaces: Fermilab; Fermi Institute; University of Durham; Perimeter Institute; King's College London
- Doctoral advisor: John M. Stewart
- Doctoral students: Antonio Padilla
- Website: maths.dur.ac.uk/~dma0rag/

Ruth Ann Watson Gregory is a British mathematician and physicist, currently Head of Department of Physics and Professor of Theoretical Physics at King's College London. Her fields of specialisation are general relativity and cosmology.

== Education ==
Gregory earned her PhD from the Department of Applied Mathematics and Theoretical Physics at Trinity College, Cambridge in 1988, writing a thesis on "topological defects in cosmology" supervised by John M. Stewart.

== Career ==
Gregory held postdoctoral appointments at the Fermi National Accelerator Laboratory and Fermi Institute in the University of Chicago, before returning to Cambridge for a five-year research fellowship. She was appointed Professor of Mathematics and Physics at the University of Durham in 2005. Gregory held this post until her appointment as Head of Department of Physics and Professor of Theoretical Physics at King's College London in 2021.

She is a visiting fellow at the Perimeter Institute for Theoretical Physics where she lectures as part of the PSI's master's programme.

She serves as a managing editor of International Journal of Modern Physics D.

== Research ==
Her research centres on the intersection of fundamental high energy physics and cosmology. She is best known for the Gregory–Laflamme instability, describing an instability of black strings in higher dimensions.

== Awards and honours ==
Gregory was given the 2006 Maxwell Medal and Prize by the Institute of Physics for her contributions to physics at the interface of general relativity and string theory, in particular for her work on the physics of cosmic strings and black holes.

In 2011 she received the Royal Society Wolfson Research Merit Award to study Time and Extra Dimensions in Space.

== Selected publications ==
- Gregory, Ruth; Laflamme, Raymond (1993), "Black strings and p-branes are unstable", Physical Review Letters, 70 (19): 2837–2840, arXiv:hep-th/9301052, Bibcode:1993PhRvL..70.2837G, doi:10.1103/PhysRevLett.70.2837, MR 1215408, PMID 10053666, S2CID 118877812.
- Gregory, Ruth; Laflamme, Raymond (1994), "The instability of charged black strings and p-branes", Nuclear Physics, 428 (1–2): 399–434, arXiv:hep-th/9404071, Bibcode:1994NuPhB.428..399G, doi:10.1016/0550-3213(94)90206-2, MR 1299265, S2CID 118870476.
- Bowcock, Peter; Charmousis, Christos; Gregory, Ruth (2000), "General brane cosmologies and their global spacetime structure", Classical and Quantum Gravity, 17 (22): 4745–4763, arXiv:hep-th/0007177, Bibcode:2000CQGra..17.4745B, doi:10.1088/0264-9381/17/22/313, MR 1797969, S2CID 17088843.
- Gregory, Ruth (2000), "Nonsingular global string compactifications", Physical Review Letters, 84 (12): 2564–2567, arXiv:hep-th/9911015, Bibcode:2000PhRvL..84.2564G, doi:10.1103/PhysRevLett.84.2564, MR 1746624, PMID 11017270, S2CID 2068529.
- Gregory, Ruth (2000), "Black string instabilities in anti-de Sitter space", Classical and Quantum Gravity, 17 (18): L125–L131, arXiv:hep-th/0004101, Bibcode:2000CQGra..17L.125G, doi:10.1088/0264-9381/17/18/103, MR 1791092, S2CID 14175513.
- Gregory, Ruth; Rubakov, Valery A.; Sibiryakov, Sergei M. (2000), "Opening up extra dimensions at ultralarge scales", Physical Review Letters, 84 (26, part 1): 5928–5931, arXiv:hep-th/0002072, Bibcode:2000PhRvL..84.5928G, doi:10.1103/PhysRevLett.84.5928, MR 1766870, PMID 10991091, S2CID 7058868.
