= Maria V. Chekhova =

Russian-German physicist

Maria V. Chekhova (born 1963) is a Russian-German physicist known for her research on quantum optics and in particular on the quantum entanglement of pairs of photons. She is a researcher at the Max Planck Institute for the Science of Light in Erlangen, Germany, where she heads an independent research group on quantum radiation, and a professor at the University of Erlangen–Nuremberg, in the chair of experimental physics (optics).

== Education and career ==
Chekhova was born on 8 June 1963 in Moscow, and educated in physics at Moscow State University, where she earned a master's degree in 1986, completed a Ph.D. in 1989, and earned a habilitation in 2004. She was a full-time researcher at Moscow State University from 1989 to 2010, continuing on a part-time basis until 2020. In the meantime, she took her present position at the Max Planck Institute for the Science of Light in 2010. In 2020, she added a part-time affiliation as professor at the University of Erlangen–Nuremberg.

In November 2021 Chekhova was elected for the "Optica Fellow 2022" for "pioneering contributions to the science and applications of photon pairs and twin beams".

== Book ==
Chekhova is the coauthor, with Peter Banzer, of the textbook Polarization of Light: In Classical, Quantum and Nonlinear Optics (De Gruyter, 2021).
