= Philip Russell (physicist) =

British physicist

Philip St. John Russell, FRS, (born March 25, 1953, in Belfast) is Emeritus Director of the Max Planck Institute for the Science of Light in Erlangen, Germany. His area of research covers "photonics and new materials", in particular the examination of new optical materials, especially of photonic crystal fibres, and more generally the field of nano- and micro-structured photonic materials.

== Education and career ==
Russell obtained his DPhil in 1979 at the University of Oxford, where he was working on volume holography. From 1978 he was a Junior Research Fellow at Oriel College, Oxford.

In 1982 he moved to the Technische Universität Hamburg-Harburg as an Alexander von Humboldt Fellow. In 1986 he joined the fibre optics group at the University of Southampton and began to work on the realisation of his idea of photonic crystal fibres, which were first demonstrated practically in 1996. Between 1996 and 2005, Russell worked at the University of Bath, and during his time there built up and led the Photonics and Photonic Materials Group (PPMG). He then joined the Max Planck Research Group at the Institute of Optics, Information and Photonics at the University of Erlangen-Nuremberg, which became the Max Planck Institute for the Science of Light (MPL) in 2009, with him being a founding director. He has been Emritus Director of the MPL since 2021.

He is the founder of BlazePhotonics Limited, a company whose aim was the commercial exploitation of photonic crystal fibre. The company, which holds the world record for low loss hollow core photonic crystal fibre, was acquired by Crystal Fibre a/s in August 2004.

== Awards and honours ==
Russell is a Fellow of the Optical Society of America and the founding chair of the OSA Topical Meeting Series on Bragg Gratings, Photosensitivity and Poling in Glass. In 2000 he won OSA's Joseph Fraunhofer Award/Robert M. Burley Prize for the invention of photonic crystal ("holey") fibre, which he first proposed in 1991.

In 2002 he won the Applied Optics Division Prize of the UK Institute of Physics. In 2004 he won the Thomas Young Medal and Prize of the Institute of Physics, and in 2005 he was elected a Fellow of the Royal Society. In September 2005 he received the Körber European Science Prize from the Hamburg-based Körber Foundation. From 2005 to 2006 he was a IEEE/LEOS Distinguished Lecturer, and from 2007 to 2009 a Director-At-Large of the Optical Society of America. In 2014 he was awarded the Berthold Leibinger Zukunftspreis. In 2015 he was awarded the Institute of Electrical and Electronics Engineers' Photonics Award, and he was the President of the Optical Society of America in 2015, the International Year of Light.

He is the recipient of a Royal Society/Wolfson Research Merit Award, and in 2018 won the Rank Prize in Optoelectronics.

== Selected publications ==
- Russell, P. St. J. (2003). "Photonic Crystal Fibers". Science. 299 (5605): 358–362. Bibcode:2003Sci...299..358R. doi:10.1126/science.1079280. ISSN 0036-8075. PMID 12532007. S2CID 136470113.
- Russell, P. St. J. (2007). "Photonic Crystal Fiber: Finding the Holey Grail". Optics and Photonics News. 18 (7): 26. Bibcode:2007OptPN..18...26R. doi:10.1364/OPN.18.7.000026. ISSN 1047-6938.
- Cregan, R. F.; Mangan, B. J.; Knight, J. C.; Birks, T. A.; Russell, P. St. J.; Roberts, P. J.; Allan, D. C. (1999). "Single-Mode Photonic Band Gap Guidance of Light in Air". Science. 285 (5433): 1537–1539. doi:10.1126/science.285.5433.1537. ISSN 0036-8075. PMID 10477511.
- Birks, T. A.; Knight, J. C.; Russell, P. St.J. (1997). "Endlessly single-mode photonic crystal fiber". Optics Letters. 22 (13): 961–3. Bibcode:1997OptL...22..961B. doi:10.1364/OL.22.000961. ISSN 0146-9592. PMID 18185719.
- Knight, J. C.; Birks, T. A.; Russell, P. St. J.; Atkin, D. M. (1996). "All-silica single-mode optical fiber with photonic crystal cladding". Optics Letters. 21 (19): 1547–9. Bibcode:1996OptL...21.1547K. doi:10.1364/OL.21.001547. ISSN 0146-9592. PMID 19881720.
