= Gregory–Laflamme instability =

Result in higher-dimensional physics

The Gregory–Laflamme instability (after Ruth Gregory and Raymond Laflamme) is a result in theoretical physics which states that certain black strings and branes are unstable in dimensions higher than four.

In their seminal papers in 1993 and 1994, Gregory and Laflamme showed that certain branes and Higher-dimensional Einstein gravity black string solutions in theories of gravity in higher dimensions $D \ge 5$ are found to exhibit an instability to small perturbations.

The end point of this instability has been studied to higher dimensions and a critical dimension has been found to exist below which the end state of instability is a black hole phase, i.e., for $5 \le D \le 13$. Above the critical dimension the instability drives to a non-uniform black ring phase.
