= Max Planck Institute for the Science of Light =

Physics institute in Erlangen, Germany

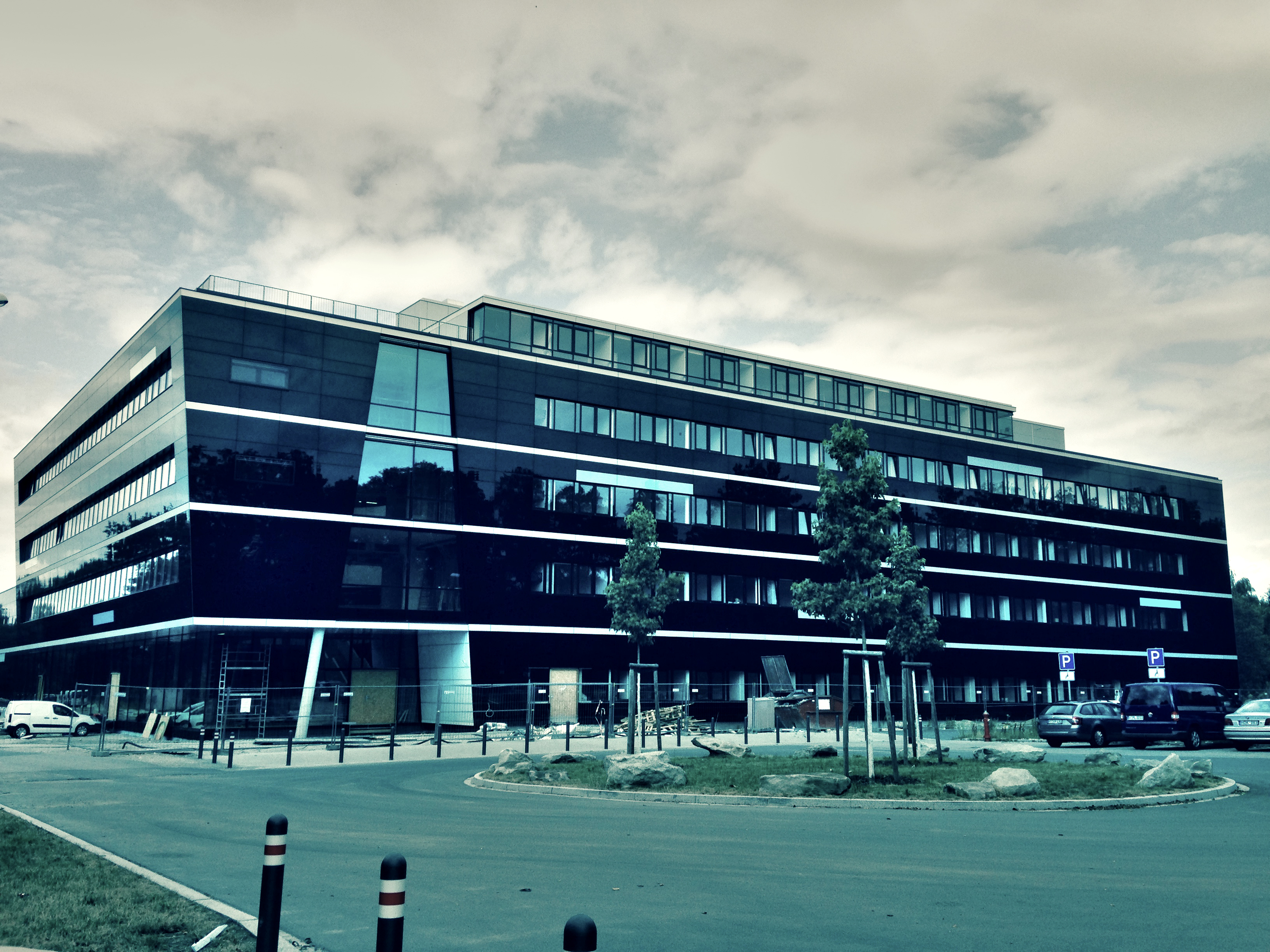
- The new building of the MPL in Erlangen
- Abbreviation: MPL
- Formation: 2009; 17 years ago
- Type: Scientific institute
- Purpose: Research in optics and photonics
- Headquarters: Erlangen, Germany
- Coordinates: 49.582461°N 11.027331°E
- Key people: Philip Russell, Vahid Sandoghdar, Florian Marquardt, Jochen Guck
- Parent organization: Max Planck Society
- Website: http://www.mpl.mpg.de/
- Formerly called: Max Planck Research Group for Optics, Information and Photonics

The Max Planck Institute for the Science of Light (MPL) performs basic research in optical metrology, optical communication, new optical materials, plasmonics and nanophotonics and optical applications in biology and medicine. It is part of the Max Planck Society and was founded on January 1, 2009 in Erlangen near Nuremberg. The institute is based on the Max Planck Research Group "Optics, Information and Photonics", which was founded in 2004 at the University of Erlangen-Nuremberg, as a precursor. The institute currently comprises four divisions.

== Structure ==
The institute currently is organized in four divisions, each led by a director with equal rights. The institute researchers are supported by several scientifically active technology development and service units. It is also the home of several Max Planck Research Groups that are organizationally independent of the divisions. The MPL hosts an International Max Planck Research School Physics of Light . Through the appointment of the directors and affiliated professors as university professors, through several affiliated groups and participation in graduate schools, a collaboration between the MPL and the University of Erlangen-Nuremberg is maintained.

=== Division Russell - "Photonic Crystal Fibres" ===
The division "Photonics and New Materials" is led by Prof. Philip St. J. Russell. The winner of the prestigious Körber European Science Prize was awarded the Alfried Krupp von Bohlen und Halbach chair with his move from the University of Bath to Erlangen. The division investigates new optical materials, especially photonic crystal fibers.

=== Division Marquardt - "Theory" ===
The theory division is headed by Florian Marquardt. The research of the division is mainly concerned with light–matter interaction, the topics covered include cavity optomechanics and interaction of electromagnetic radiation with qubits, as well as many-body physics.

=== Division Sandoghdar - "Nanooptics" ===
In 2010 Prof. Vahid Sandoghdar was appointed the third director of the Max Planck Institute for the Science of Light. Sandoghdar, previously working at ETH Zurich, was awarded the prestigious Alexander von Humboldt Professorships at the University of Erlangen-Nuremberg. His fields of interest comprise nanooptics, biophotonics and plasmonics.

=== Division Guck - "Biological Optomechanics" ===
On Oktober 1st, 2018 Jochen Guck was named Director of the new Division "Biological Optomechanics". His team will do basic research in the field of biophysics and in the interface between physics and medicine. In the coming years Guck will move to the Max Planck Zentrum für Physik und Medizin (MPZ-PM), which is being built in a cooperation with the Friedrich-Alexander University Erlangen-Nuernberg and the University Hospital Erlangen.

=== Independent Research Groups ===
- Leuchs Emeritus Group: Optics and Information
- Chekhova Research Group: Quantum and Photonic Crystal Fibres
- Joly Research Group: Microstructured optical fiber
- Genes Research Group: Light-matter interfaces
- Viola-Kusminskiy Research Group: Theory of hybrid systems for quantum technologies
- Singh Research Group: Microendoscopy
- Christoph Marquardt Research Group: Quantum Information Processing
- Stiller Research Group: Quantum Opto-Acoustics
- Fattahi Research Group: Femtosecond Molecular Fieldsocopy
- Del'Haye Research Group: Microphotonics
- Zieske Research Group

=== Technology Development and Service Units ===
- TDSU 1: Micro- and nanostructuring
- TDSU 2: Optical technologies
- TDSU 3: Fiber fabrication and glass studio
- TDSU 4: Lab-on-a-chip Systems

=== Former Research Groups ===
- Junior research group "integrated quantum optics", led by Christine Silberhorn,
- Research group "Nonlinear photonic nanostructure", led by Fabio Biancalana,
- Research group "Optical quantum information theory", led by Peter van Loock,
- Max Planck fellow group "Laser Physics and Photonics" led by Prof. Dr. Lijun Wang with a focus on optical high precision measurements.

=== Max Planck – University of Ottawa Centre for Extreme and Quantum Photonics ===
Max Planck - University of Ottawa Centre for Extreme and Quantum Photonics" offers a platform for close cooperation and scientific exchange between uOttawa and the Max Planck Society. Since 2012, uOttawa and the Max Planck Institute for the Science of Light have maintained intensive research collaboration through student and staff exchanges, international workshops and joint research projects. Particular emphasis is placed on the development of very high-intensity laser sources, the development of optical methods relevant to quantum information science, and the manufacture of components for classical and quantum photonics.

== History ==
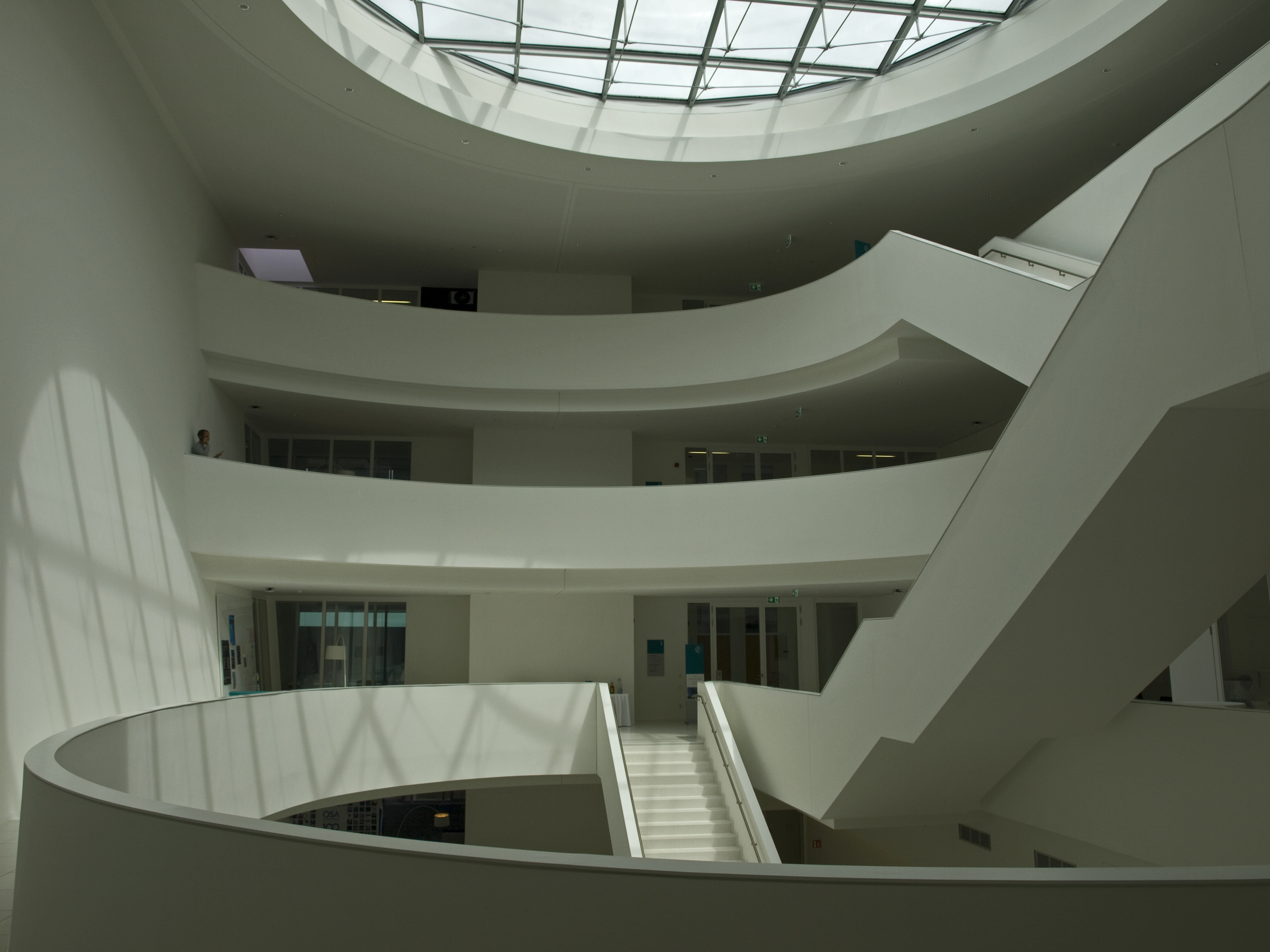
The interior of the building

The purpose of Max Planck Research Groups (MPRG) at various universities is to strengthen networking between universities and institutes of the Max Planck Society.

In 2004, the Max-Planck Society established a new Max Planck Research Group, "Optics, Information, and Photonics", at the Friedrich-Alexander University of Erlangen–Nuremberg to advance collaboration between that university and the Max Planck Society. In June 2008, after an evaluation, the senate of the Max Planck Society decided to convert this group to a Max Planck institute and thereupon founded the "Max Planck Institute for the Science of Light" (German "Max-Planck-Institut für die Physik des Lichts"). with effect from January 1, 2009.

In 2016, the new building was opened. The project was made by the Munich architecture bureau Fritsch + Tschaidse Architekten GmbH.
