= Gerd Leuchs =

German physicist

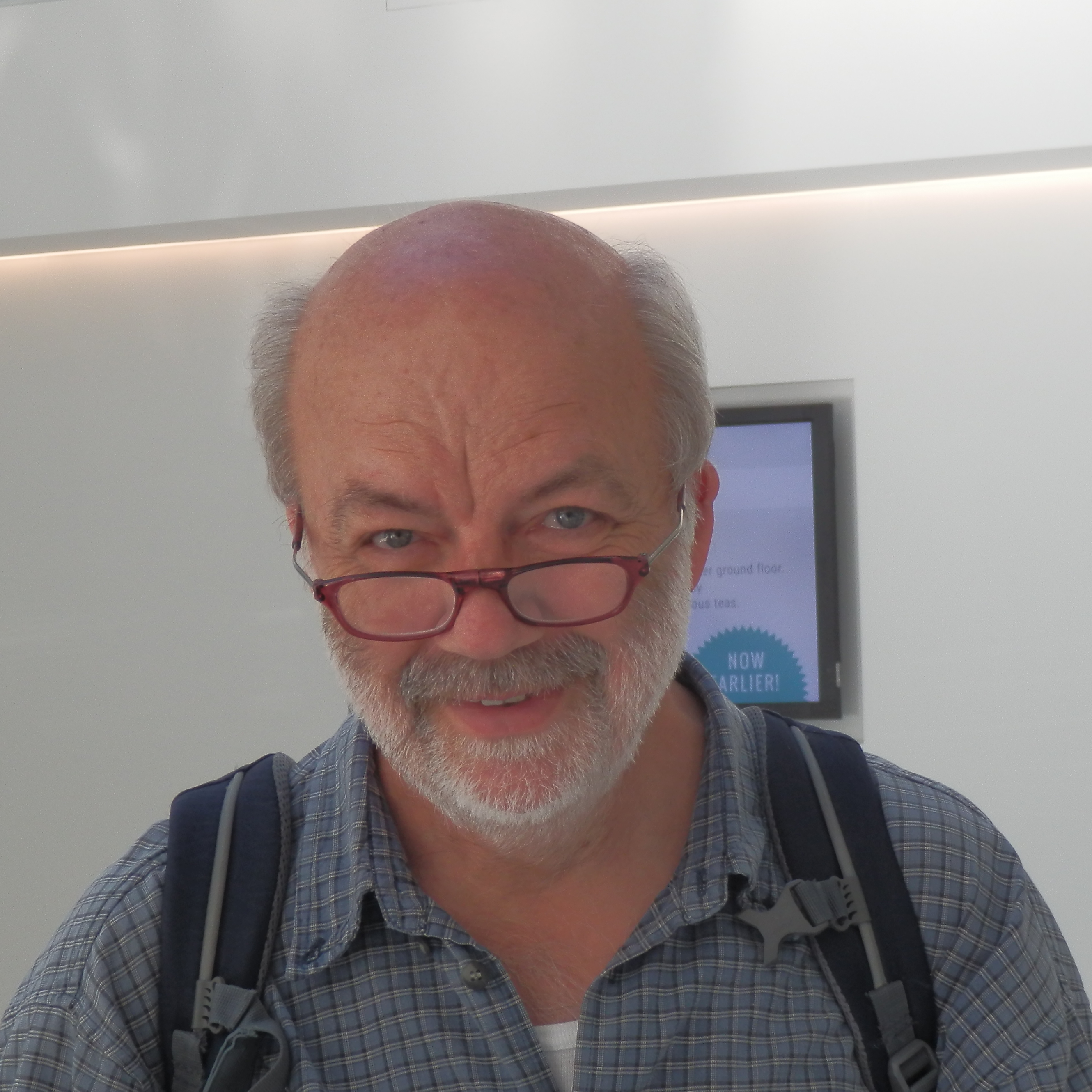
- Leuchs in 2019
- Born: Gerhard Leuchs; June 14, 1950 (age 76); Wuppertal, Germany
- Education: University of Cologne (B.S.); LMU Munich (Ph.D.)
- Awards: Quantum Electronics Prize (2005); Julius von Haast Fellowship Award (2017); Herbert Walther Award (2018)
- Scientific career
- Fields: optics, quantum information science
- Workplaces: Max Planck Institute for the Science of Light; Friedrich-Alexander University Erlangen-Nürnberg; University of Ottawa

Gerhard "Gerd" Leuchs (born June 14, 1950) is a German experimental physicist in optics. He is the Director Emeritus at the Max Planck Institute for the Science of Light and an adjunct professor in the physics department at the University of Ottawa. From 1994-2019 he was a full professor of physics and since 2019 has been a senior professor at Friedrich-Alexander University Erlangen-Nürnberg (FAU).

Leuchs holds honorary degrees from the Technical University of Denmark and Saint Petersburg State University. He served as the President of Optica (formerly the Optical Society) in 2024.

== Education ==
Leuchs studied physics and mathematics at the University of Cologne from 1970 to 1975 and received his doctorate from LMU Munich in 1978. From 1980 to 1981, Leuchs served as a visiting fellow for the Joint Institute for Laboratory Astrophysics (JILA) in Boulder, Colorado.

Leuchs served as the Feodor-Lynen Fellow for the Alexander von Humboldt Foundation, the Heisenberg Fellow for the German Science Foundation and as a Visiting Professor for the Australian National University.

Leuchs' research includes quantum mechanics, quantum beats, nanophotonics and related topics in optics.

== Research and career ==
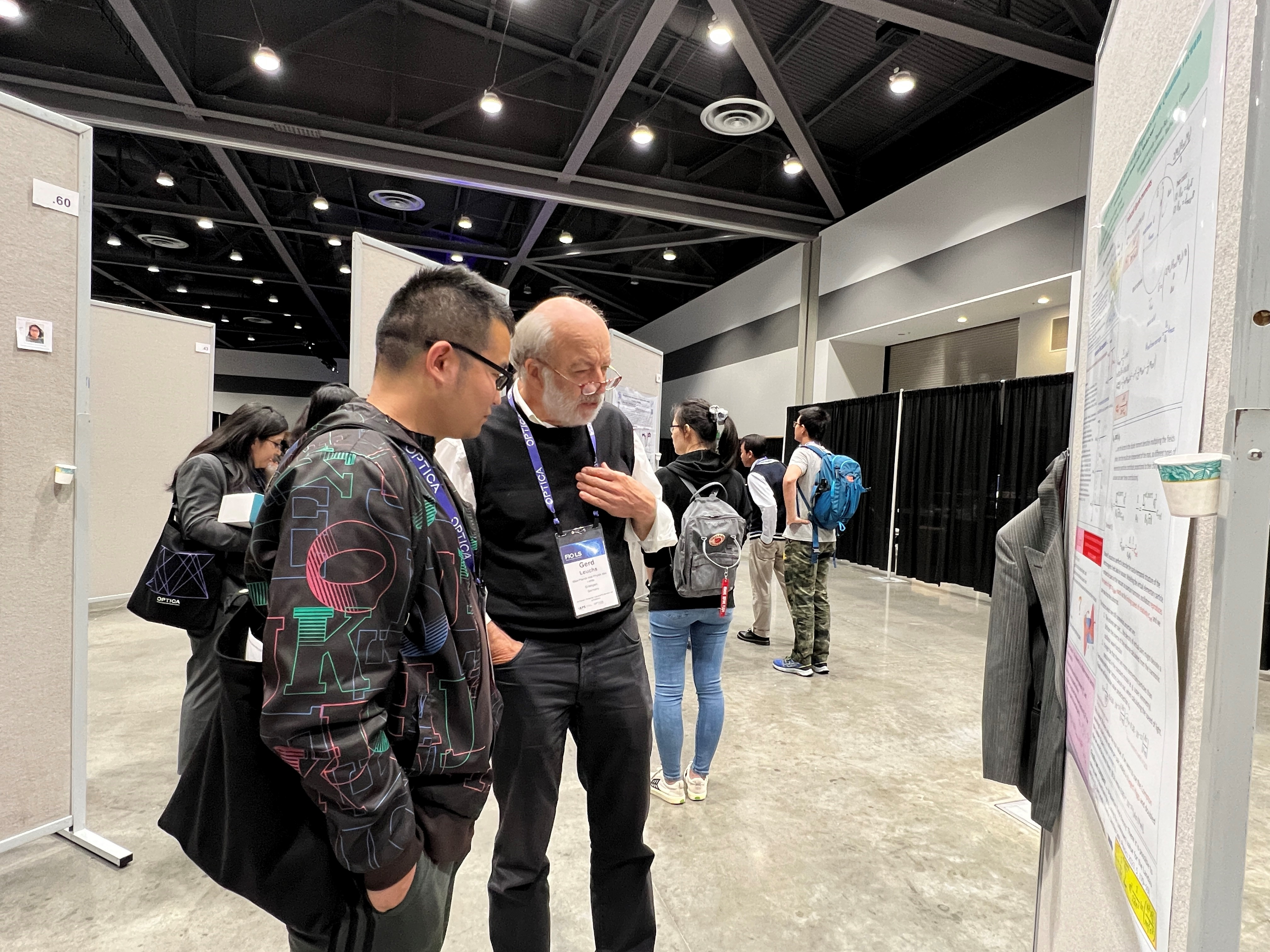
Gerd Leuchs at the 2023 Frontiers in Optics + Laser Science conference, during the student poster session.

From 1985-1989, Leuchs served as the head of the gravitational wave group at the Max Planck Institute of Quantum Optics. He was a founding director of the Max Planck Institute for the Science of Light when it was converted from the Max Planck Research Group for Optics, Information and Photonics.

In 2003, Leuchs' research team demonstrated, for the first time, that a radially polarized field can be focused to a tighter spot size than for standard linear polarization. The electromagnetic field produced by the tightly focused light can be used to manipulate atoms or other small-scale objects.

In 2010, Leuchs' research team, in collaboration with the Université libre de Bruxelles, developed a quantum error correcting code, an early demonstration of error correction achieved at the quanta scale. The correcting code, based on linear optics, protects against the loss of photons for quantum information processing.

== Awards and honors ==
- 2004: Fellow of Optica
- 2005: Quantum Electronics and Optics Prize from the European Physical Society
- 2005: Admission to the German Academy of Natural Scientists Leopoldina
- 2012: Cross of Merit 1st Class of the Federal Republic of Germany
- 2016: Foreign member of the Russian Academy of Sciences
- 2017: Julius von Haast Fellowship Award from the Royal Society of New Zealand
- 2018: Herbert Walther Prize from the German Physical Society and Optica
- 2018: Bavarian Maximilian Order for Science and Art
- 2018: Fellow of the American Association for the Advancement of Science
- 2023: International Fellow of the Chinese Optical Society

== Selected publications ==
- Dorn, R. (2003). "Sharper Focus for a Radially Polarized Light Beam". Physical Review Letters. 91 (23) 233901. arXiv:physics/0310007. Bibcode:2003PhRvL..91w3901D. doi:10.1103/PhysRevLett.91.233901. PMID 14683185.
- Lassen, Mikael; Sabuncu, Metin; Huck, Alexander; Niset, Julien; Leuchs, Gerd; Cerf, Nicolas J.; Andersen, Ulrik L. (October 2010). "Quantum optical coherence can survive photon losses using a continuous-variable quantum erasure-correcting code". Nature Photonics. 4 (10): 700–705. arXiv:1006.3941. Bibcode:2010NaPho...4..700L. doi:10.1038/nphoton.2010.168. ISSN 1749-4893.
