= Pascal Del'Haye =

German physicist

- Citizenship: Germany
- Education: RWTH Aachen, LMU Munich
- Scientific career
- Fields: Experimental physics, photonics
- Workplaces: Max Planck Institute for the Science of Light
- Thesis: Optical Frequency Comb Generation in Monolithic Microresonators
- Website: http://microphotonics.net

Pascal Del'Haye is a German physicist specializing in integrated photonics. He is heading the Microphotonics Research Group at the Max Planck Institute for the Science of Light.

== Education ==
Del'Haye studied physics at RWTH Aachen and LMU Munich. He completed his Ph.D. in 2011, with a dissertation in photonics at the Max Planck Institute for Quantum Optics under the supervision of Theodor W. Hänsch and Tobias Kippenberg. He did postdoctoral work at the National Institute of Standards and Technology in Boulder, Colorado from 2011 to 2015.

== Career ==
After his postdoc at the National Institute of Standards and Technology, Del'Haye joined the National Physical Laboratory in the UK as a senior research scientist and later principal research scientist. At the National Physical Laboratory he was heading a research team on microphotonics and microresonator-based optical frequency combs. In 2020, Del'Haye moved to the Max Planck Institute for the Science of Light, where he is heading the Microphotonics Research Group. Since 2021 Del'Haye has been teaching physics at the University of Erlangen–Nuremberg.

== Research ==
Del'Haye's research is dedicated to integrated photonics, precision metrology and nonlinear optics. He made important contributions to the field of photonics, including the first demonstration of microresonator-based optical frequency combs (Kerr frequency combs). Del'Haye is also working on quantum metrology, optical precision measurements and symmetry breaking of light states. Using symmetry breaking of counterpropagating light states, he and his team demonstrated an optical diode that can be integrated into photonic chips. His work on symmetry breaking of counterpropagating light is funded by a European Research Council grant.

== Awards ==
Del'Haye's research has received worldwide recognition and numerous awards. In 2009 he received the Helmholtz Prize for the "Development of optical frequency combs on a chip". In 2013, Del'Haye received the QEOD Thesis Prize for Fundamental Aspects of the European Physical Society for the "Discovery and development of microresonator based frequency combs". For his contributions to optical frequency metrology, Del'Haye received the 2017 Young Scientist Award of the European Time and Frequency Forum.
