= Christine Silberhorn =

German physicist (born 1974)

- Silberhorn in 2025
- Born: 19 April 1974 (age 52)
- Citizenship: Germany
- Education: Erlangen University
- Scientific career
- Fields: Experimental physics, quantum optics
- Workplaces: Paderborn University
- Website: Paderborn University

Christine Silberhorn (born 19 April 1974) is a German physicist specialising in quantum optics and a full professor at the Paderborn University. In 2011, Silberhorn was awarded the Leibniz Prize and was the youngest recipient of the 2.5 million Euro prize at that time.

== Education ==
Born in Nürnberg, Germany, Silberhorn studied mathematics and physics at Erlangen University (1993–1999) and completed her Ph.D. in 2003, with a dissertation in quantum information science. She did postdoctoral work at Clarendon Laboratory of Oxford University and was a Junior Research Fellow of Wolfson College in Oxford in 2003–2004. In 2005 she joined the Max Planck Research Group "Optics, Information and Photonics" (now the Max Planck Institute for the Science of Light) as the head of the junior research group "integrated quantum optics".

== Career ==
In 2005, Silberhorn joined the Erlangen branch of the Max Planck Institute for Quantum Optics Garching, heading the Junior Research Group Integrated Quantum Optics until 2008. Upon foundation of the Max Planck Institute for the Science of Light Erlangen, she headed the Integrated Quantum Optics Group until 2010, completing her habilitation in 2008. Silberhorn is currently Chair for Integrated Quantum Optics at Paderborn University.

== Research ==
Silberhorn's research is dedicated to novel optical technologies based on quantum optics, and light-based quantum systems for use in quantum communication and quantum information processing.

She has contributed to the development of engineered quantum light sources using integrated optics and ultrafast pulsed lasers, the implementation of multichannel quantum networks for photon counting and quantum simulations, and the realization of quantum communication systems with bright light.

Silberhorn is best known for her role in leading a research project which developed photon translators for use in quantum computing and quantum communication. In 2016, the team that she ran jointly with professor Thomas Zentgraf was awarded the largest European Research Council grant for their research. In 2019, Silberhorn's team demonstrated the Hong–Ou–Mandel experiment on a single integrated photonic chip by creating, bunching and detecting two individual photons and integrating components of quantum photonics on a single chip.

== Awards ==
Silberhorn's research on the quantum properties of light and the development of quantum devices has received worldwide recognition and numerous awards, including the Hertha Sponer Prize of the German Physical Society and the Medal of the Werner von Siemens Ring Foundation in 2007, the Heinz Maier-Leibnitz-Preis in 2008 and the Gottfried Wilhelm Leibniz-Prize in 2011. For the latter, she was the youngest scientist to receive this award. In 2019, Silberhorn was named a Fellow of The Optical Society.

She has been a member of Leopoldina, the national academy of Germany, since 2012.
