= List of people from Adelaide =

This is an incomplete list of notable people from Adelaide.

== Arts and music ==
Prominent intellectuals, writers, artists, bands, and musicians to hail from Adelaide include:

=== Actors ===
- Dame Judith Anderson AC DBE – Rebecca, And Then There Were None; Tony and Emmy Award winner
- Elspeth Ballantyne – Prisoner
- Holly Brisley – Home and Away
- Sam Clark – Neighbours
- Kate Fischer – Sirens
- Sir Robert Helpmann CBE – Chitty Chitty Bang Bang, Alice's Adventures in Wonderland
- Nicholas Hope – Bad Boy Bubby
- Dichen Lachman – Neighbours, Dollhouse, Severance
- Anthony LaPaglia – Without a Trace
- Jonathan LaPaglia – Seven Days, The District
- Glenn McMillan – Wonderland, Power Rangers Ninja Storm
- John Noble – Fringe
- Ben Oxenbould – Hey Dad..!
- Teresa Palmer – December Boys, I Am Number Four
- Lois Ramsey – Road to Nhill, Home and Away
- Mandahla Rose – All About E, Oranges and Sunshine
- Xavier Samuel – The Twilight Saga: Eclipse
- Hugh Sheridan – Packed to the Rafters
- Kodi Smit-McPhee – The Power of the Dog; Oscar-nominated actor
- Sonia Todd – McLeod's Daughters
- Sarah Snook – Succession; Golden Globe winner
- Adam Tuominen – Power Rangers Ninja Storm, Underbelly: Razor, Escape from Pretoria
- Melanie Vallejo – Winners and Losers, Power Rangers Mystic Force
- Samara Weaving
- Shabana Azeez – The Pitt

=== Comedians ===
- Anthony Lehmann – aka "Lehmo" Lehmann
- Richard Marsland
- Shaun Micallef
- Greig Pickhaver AM – aka "H.G. Nelson"
- Roy Rene – aka "Mo McCackie"
- Frank Woodley

=== Film directors ===
- Mario Andreacchio
- David James Campbell
- Alex Frayne
- Rolf de Heer
- Scott Hicks
- Pip Karmel
- Justin Kurzel
- Anthony Maras
- Danny and Michael Philippou
- Michael James Rowland

=== Humanities ===
- Graeme Hugo – demographer and Federation Fellow (2002)
- J. J. C. Smart – philosopher
- Hugh Stretton – historian and sociologist
- Peter Sutton – anthropologist
- Wesley Wildman – philosopher, theologian, ethicist
- Ghil'ad Zuckermann – linguist and revivalist

=== Journalists ===
- Annabel Crabb – political writer and commentator
- Brady Haran OAM – independent video journalist and Internet personality
- Jenni Hogan – TV reporter and host, Emmy Award winner
- Christian Kerr – political commentator and journalist
- David Koch – financial journalist and former presenter of Sunrise
- Bruce McAvaney OAM – sports broadcaster
- Hamish McLachlan – television sports commentator for the Seven Network
- David Penberthy – editor-in-chief of the Australian newspaper The Daily Telegraph

=== Musicians and bands ===
- Allday
- The Angels
- At Sunset
- Atlas Genius
- The Audreys
- Grace Bawden
- Jimmy Barnes
- The Beards
- Beeb Birtles
- Bit By Bats
- David Campbell
- Wes Carr
- Julian Cochran
- Cold Chisel
- Beccy Cole
- Michael Crafter
- Delta
- Fraternity
- Funkoars
- Peter Furler
- Dave Graney
- Angie Hart
- Hilltop Hoods
- The Hot Lies
- I Killed the Prom Queen
- Jim Keays
- Paul Kelly
- Rachael Leahcar
- Lowrider
- Tkay Maidza
- The Mark of Cain
- The Masters Apprentices
- Reece Mastin
- Sarah McLeod
- Sister Janet Mead
- Rudy Nikkerud
- Orianthi Panagaris
- Redgum
- Aleesha Rome
- Guy Sebastian
- Glenn Shorrock
- Sia
- Benjamin Speed
- The Superjesus
- Swanee
- Michelle Tumes
- The Twilights
- Universum
- Virgin Black
- Wolf & Cub
- Wade Nixon (Dankpods/Dankmus)

=== Visual artists ===
- James Ashton – painter and arts educator
- Dorrit Black – modernist printmaker and painter
- Michal Dutkiewicz – comic book artist and illustrator, three-time winner of the Stanley Award
- Robert Hannaford AM – portrait artist, three-time winner of the People's Choice Award of the Archibald Prize
- Barbara Hanrahan – artist, printmaker and writer
- Sir Hans Heysen OBE – landscape painter, nine-time winner of the Wynne Prize
- Nora Heysen AM – portrait artist, first female winner of the Archibald Prize
- Ondrej Mares – sculptor and furniture maker
- Joseph Stanislaus Ostoja-Kotkowski AM – painting, photography, film-making, theatre design, fabric design, murals, kinetic and static sculpture, stained glass, vitreous enamel murals, op-collages, computer graphics, and laser art
- Geoffrey Proud – portrait and landscape painter, sculptor, winner of the 1990 Archibald Prize, winner of the 1975 Sulman Prize
- Jeffrey Smart AO – precisionist landscape painter
- Susan Dorothea White – painter, sculptor and printmaker

=== Writers ===
- Malcolm Afford – playwright and novelist
- Guy Boothby – novelist and travel writer
- James Bradley – novelist and critic
- Brian Castro – novelist
- Nancy Cato – author
- J. M. Coetzee – novelist and essayist, winner of the Nobel Prize in Literature
- Aidan Coleman – poet
- David Conyers – science fiction author
- Geoffrey Dutton AO – poet, author and historian, winner of the Grace Leven Prize for Poetry
- Max Fatchen AM – journalist and children's author
- Mem Fox AM – educator and children's author
- Holly Gramazio - novelist and game designer
- Peter Goldsworthy AM – novelist, poet and scriptwriter, winner of the Helpmann Award
- Christine Harris – children's and young adult author
- Max Harris AO – poet, critic and columnist
- Vernon Knowles – fantasy author
- Kym Lardner – children's author, illustrator, and storyteller
- Caleb Lewis – playwright
- Agnes Murgoci – folklorist
- DBC Pierre – novelist, winner of the Man Booker Prize
- Gillian Rubinstein – children's author and playwright
- Bel Schenk – poet
- Tony Shillitoe – fantasy author
- Tim Sinclair – poet and novelist
- Hugh Stretton – historian and sociologist
- Anne Summers – feminist writer and editor
- Colin Thiele AC – children's author and educator, winner of the Dromkeen medal
- David Thorne – humorist and satirist
- Russel Ward – historian and author of The Australian Legend
- Sean Williams – science fiction author
- Ben Winch – novelist
- Nan Witcomb – poet
- Laetitia Withall – poet, author and suffragette

== Business and media ==
- Rick Allert AO – accountant, company director and chairperson
- Balfours family – bakery founders
- Barr Smith family – businessmen and philanthropists
- Matt Barrie – entrepreneur, CEO Freelancer Limited
- Shaun Bonétt – property developer, entrepreneur and philanthropist
- Cooper family – brewery founders
- Thomas Elder GCMG – pastoralist, politician and philanthropist
- Gerard family – founders of Clipsal
- Haigh family – chocolatiers
- Edward Hayward Kt – owner and manager of John Martins
- Sir Sidney Kidman – pastoralist, entrepreneur and landowner
- Matthew and Zbigniew Michalewicz – entrepreneurs and co-founders of SolveIT Software
- Rupert Murdoch AC – media mogul, chairperson and CEO of News Corporation
- Wade Nixon – creator of the YouTube channel DankPods
- Mary Penfold – winemaker
- John Spalvins – managing director of Adelaide Steamship Company
- Robert Stigwood – impresario, entertainment entrepreneur and film producer
- Michael Tunn – radio announcer and program director
- Gary Turner – producer, record company owner and founder of LearnToPlayMusic.com

== Law and politics ==
- Julie Bishop – Minister for Foreign Affairs and deputy leader of the Liberal Party of Australia
- Sir John Langdon Bonython KCMG – member of the first Australian parliament
- Sir John Lavington Bonython – mayor and lord mayor of Adelaide
- Michael Bradley – mayor of Sarnia, Ontario, Canada
- James Crawford – legal academic and judge of the International Court of Justice (2014)
- Mario Despoja – leader of the Croatian community in Australia
- Natasha Stott Despoja AM – senator and leader of the Australian Democrats
- Alexander Downer AC – Foreign Affairs Minister and leader of the opposition
- Alexander Downer, Sr. KBE – member of the House of Representatives and High Commissioner to London
- John Downer KCMG KC – twice premier of South Australia
- John Finnis – professor of Law at University College, Oxford
- Julia Gillard – prime minister and leader of the Australian Labor Party
- Janine Haines – senator and leader of the Australian Democrats
- Sir Charles Kingston – premier of South Australia and Minister for Trade and Customs in the first Commonwealth parliament
- Dame Roma Mitchell AC DBE CVO – Australia's first female QC, first female judge, and first female governor
- Christopher Pyne – Minister for Defence
- Catherine Helen Spence – suffragist, electoral reformer, prohibitionist, and first female political candidate in Australia
- Ian Wilson AM – member of the Australian House of Representatives and Minister for Aboriginal Affairs
- Sir Keith Wilson CBE – senator and member of the Australian House of Representatives
- Penny Wong – Labor politician and Minister for Foreign Affairs
- List of mayors and lord mayors of Adelaide
- List of premiers of South Australia
- Category: Federal politicians from South Australia

== Science ==
World-renowned Adelaide scientists include:

- Col Bailey – naturalist
- Len Beadell OAM BEM – surveyor, roadbuilder and explorer; asteroid 3161 Beadell is named after him
- William Henry Bragg OM KBE PRS – physicist, chemist and mathematician, winner of the Nobel Prize in Physics
- William Lawrence Bragg CH OBE MC FRS – physicist and crystallographer, winner of the Nobel Prize in Physics and youngest Nobel laureate
- Rodney Brooks – roboticist, director of the MIT Computer Science and Artificial Intelligence Laboratory and founding member of the iRobot corporation
- Ronald Fisher (1890–1962), polymath, mathematician, statistician, biologist, geneticist,
- Baron Howard Florey OM FRS FRCP – pharmacologist and pathologist, winner of the Nobel Prize in Physiology or Medicine
- Basil Stuart Hetzel AC – medical researcher who made a major contribution to combating iodine deficiency
- Cecil Madigan – geologist and meteorologist, member of the Australasian Antarctic Expedition
- Sir Douglas Mawson OBE FRS FAA – geologist and explorer, leader of the Australasian Antarctic Expedition
- Sir Mark Oliphant AC KBE FRS FAA – nuclear physicist, winner of the Hughes Medal and the Faraday Medal
- Enid Lucy Robertson AM – botanist, conservationist
- Reg Sprigg AO – geologist and conservationist
- George Szekeres FAA AM – mathematician, after whom the George Szekeres Medal is named
- Terence Tao FRS FAA – mathematician, winner of the Fields Medal
- Andy Thomas AO – aerospace engineer and NASA astronaut
- David Unaipon – inventor and writer, commemorated on the Australian fifty-dollar note
- Robin Warren AC – pathologist and researcher, winner of the Nobel Prize in Medicine
- Sir Hubert Wilkins – Antarctic aviation pioneer, Arctic explorer, ornithologist and geographer

== Sport ==
Internationally and nationally recognised sports people from Adelaide include:

=== Aerobatics ===
- Chris Sperou – thirteen-time National Aerobatics Champion, and five-time participant in the FAI World Aerobatic Championships

=== Archery ===
- Simon Fairweather OAM – Olympic gold medalist

=== Athletics ===
- Matthew Clarke (born 1995) – distance runner
- Jessica Stenson (born 1987) – distance runner

=== Australian rules football ===
- Nathan Buckley – captained the Collingwood Football Club, winner of the Brownlow Medal
- Mark Ricciuto – player for the Adelaide Crows, winner of the Brownlow Medal
- Adam Cooney – player for the Western Bulldogs and the Essendon Football Club, winner of the Brownlow Medal
- Matthew Pavlich – captained the Fremantle Football Club
- Adelaide Football Club players
- Port Adelaide Football Club players

=== Basketball ===
- Mark Bradtke – played one season in the NBA for the Philadelphia 76ers, played in the NBL for the Adelaide 36ers, Melbourne Tigers and Brisbane Bullets
- Lindsay Gaze – played for the Australian Boomers in three Olympics and coached the team in four Olympics
- Joe Ingles – plays for the Orlando Magic in the NBA
- Ben Madgen – plays in the NBL for the Sydney Kings
- Brett Maher – played in the NBL for the Adelaide 36ers
- Mike McKay – played in the NBL for the West Adelaide Bearcats, Adelaide 36ers, Brisbane Bullets, Canberra Cannons and Wollongong Hawks
- Brad Newley – plays in Spain for CB Gran Canaria, drafted to the NBA by the Houston Rockets
- Erin Phillips – plays in the WNBA for the Phoenix Mercury, played for the Connecticut Sun
- Luke Schenscher – played in the NBA for the Chicago Bulls and the Portland Trail Blazers
- Phil Smyth AM – played in the NBL for the St Kilda Saints, Canberra Cannons, Adelaide 36ers and Sydney Kings

=== Brazilian jiu-jitsu ===
- Craig Jones – two-time ADCC silver medalist (2019–2022)

=== Cricket ===
- Greg Blewett – played for the Australian national cricket team
- Sir Donald Bradman AC – captained Australia, all-time highest Test batting average of any player with 99.94 (Note: Bradman was born in Cootamundra, New South Wales in 1908 and moved to Adelaide in 1934.)
- Greg Chappell MBE – captained Australia
- Ian Chappell – captained Australia
- Trevor Chappell – played for Australia
- Albert Gillespie – played first-class cricket in England
- Jason Gillespie – played for Australia
- George Goodfellow – played first-class cricket in England
- Clem Hill – captained Australia
- David Hookes – played for Australia
- Barry Jarman OAM – captained Australia
- Arthur G. Jenkins – first South Australian to umpire a cricket Test match
- Darren Lehmann – played for Australia; current (2015) coach of the Australian team
- Wayne Phillips – played for Australia
- Vic Richardson OBE – captained Australia; won Magarey Medal (Australian Rules Football) and represented Australia in baseball; grandfather of Ian, Greg and Trevor Chappell
- Shaun Tait – plays for Australia

=== Cycling ===
- Alex Edmondson – Commonwealth Games Team pursuit champion, World individual pursuit champion 2014
- Annette Edmondson – Commonwealth Games gold medalist 2014, Olympic bronze medalist in the omnium 2012
- Matthew Glaetzer – Olympic gold, silver and bronze medalist for the Australian Cyclist team since 2009
- Alexandra Manly – professional cyclist at Orica-AIS
- Stephanie Morton – Commonwealth Games individual sprint champion 2014
- Stuart O'Grady OAM – Olympic gold medalist in the men's madison, silver and bronze medalist in the 4000m team pursuit, bronze medalist in the points race, and four-time second-place finisher in the Tour de France
- Michael Turtur OAM – Olympic gold medalist in the Team Pursuit, and race director of the Tour Down Under
- Kimberley Wells – two-time national criterium champion, and current professional cyclist
- Sam Willoughby – Olympic silver medalist in the men's BMX and UCI BMX world champion

=== Darts ===
- Rob Modra – two-time Geelong Open Darts Championships winner

=== Golf ===
- Geoff Ogilvy – U.S. Open winner and three-time World Golf Championships winner
- Adam Scott – U.S. Masters winner and World number one

=== Kickboxing ===
- Frank Giorgi – two-time Australian champion and world Super Middleweight champion
- Paul Slowinski – four-time Muay Thai world champion

=== Motor sports ===
- John Boulger – two-time Australian Speedway Champion, nine-time South Australian Champion, captained Australia to win the Speedway World Team Cup
- Jeremy Burgess – MotoGP engineer, helped Wayne Gardner, Mick Doohan and Valentino Rossi to 12 World Championships
- Garrie Cooper – founder of Elfin Sports Cars, Australian 1½ Litre Champion, Australian Sports Car Champion and Singapore Grand Prix winner
- Daniel Falzon – two-time Australian Superbike Champion
- Steve Martin – Superbike World Championship veteran and World Endurance Champion
- Billy McConnell – competes in the British Supersport Championship
- Nick Percat – V8 Supercar driver, Australian Formula Ford Champion and Bathurst 1000 winner
- Vern Schuppan – Formula One driver, 24 Hours of Le Mans winner and Indianapolis 500 Rookie of the Year
- Johnnie Walker – Australian Drivers' Champion and Australian Grand Prix winner
- Jack Young – two-time Speedway World Champion and nine-time South Australian Champion

=== Professional wrestling ===
- Bronson Reed – billed from Black Forest, signed to the WWE, former NXT North American Champion
- Rhea Ripley – signed to the WWE, current 2023 Women's Royal Rumble winner; former 1/2 of the WWE Women's Tag Team Champions; former Raw Women's Champion, former Smackdown Women's Champion (before it was renamed to the Women's World Championship, former NXT Women's Champion, former NXT UK Women's Champion and 2-time Women's World Champion (including the reign when the championship was renamed); inaugural champion for the latter

=== Soccer ===
- Dianne Alagich – played in the Women's United Soccer Association for the San Jose CyberRays, played for the Matildas
- John Aloisi – played in La Liga, Premier League and Serie A, played for the Socceroos at the FIFA World Cup
- Charlotte Grant – plays for the Matildas
- Diana Hall – played for the Matildas
- Awer Mabil – plays for FC Midtjylland
- Joel Porter – played for the Socceroos
- Alex Tobin – captained the Socceroos
- Aurelio Vidmar – captained the Socceroos
- Tony Vidmar – played for the Socceroos
- Adelaide United FC players

=== Sport aerobics ===
- Kylie Halliday – placed second at the Aerobic Gymnastics World Championships

=== Swimming ===
- Kyle Chalmers – 2016 Summer Olympics gold medalist in the 100m freestyle
- Emily Seebohm – 2012 Summer Olympics gold medalist in the 4 × 100 metre freestyle relay and 2008 Summer Olympics gold medalist in the 4 × 100 metre medley relay

=== Tennis ===
- Darren Cahill – Australian Open doubles finalist, US Open singles semi-finalist
- Ian Fletcher – tennis player, won three career doubles titles and reached a career-high singles ranking of world No. 56
- Lleyton Hewitt – U.S. Open and Wimbledon winner and World number one
- Thanasi Kokkinakis
- Alicia Molik – Australian Open and French Open doubles winner, reached World top ten singles ranking
- Mark Woodforde OAM – two-time Australian Open, one-time French Open, six-time Wimbledon, and three-time French Open doubles winner; Olympic gold and silver medalist; World number one

=== Trampoline gymnastics ===
- Blake Gaudry – 2012 Summer Olympics competitor, Australian Gymnastics Championships Winner

=== Volleyball ===
- Tania Gooley-Humphry (born 1973) – beach volleyball and indoor volleyball player
- Tamsin Hinchley (born 1980) – volleyball player
- Becchara Palmer (born 1988) – beach volleyball player
- Kerri Pottharst OAM (born 1965) – Olympic gold and bronze medalist in beach volleyball
- Andrew Schacht (born 1973) – beach volleyball player

== Other ==
- Garry Gordon Cooper – retired airline captain, ex RAAF pilot
- Gladys Elphick – Australian Aboriginal active in Aboriginal affairs
- David Hicks – former Guantanamo Bay inmate, falsely convicted of 'providing material support to terrorism'
- Mohammad Tawhidi (b. 1982 or 1983), also known as the Imam of Peace – influencer and imam

== See also ==
- List of University of Adelaide people
