= Gary Turner =

Gary or Garry Turner may refer to:

- Gary Turner (fighter) (born 1970), English mixed martial artist
- Gary Turner (musician) (born 1954), musician, composer and record company owner
- Gary Turner (basketball) (born 1945), American basketball player
- Gary Turner, founder of GT Bicycles
- Garry Turner, performer in the Circus of Horrors and Guinness world records holder
