= Zbigniew Michalewicz =

Polish entrepreneur and scientist

- Education: Master of Science Applied mathematics PhD Computer science
- Alma mater: Polish Academy of Sciences
- Occupations: Chief Scientific Officer at Complexica author professor
- Organization: Complexica
- Known for: Optimization

Zbigniew Michalewicz is an entrepreneur, author and professor in the fields of mathematical optimisation and new technologies. He is the author of over 250 articles and 25 books which have been widely cited. He is the co-founder of NuTech Solutions, SolveIT Software, and Complexica where he currently serves as the Chief Scientific Officer.

== Early life and education ==
Michalewicz attended Warsaw University of Technology where he earned a Master of Science degree in Applied Mathematics in 1974. In 1975, Michalewicz joined the faculty of the Institute of Computer Science at the Polish Academy of Sciences as a researcher. While there, he obtained a PhD in Computer Science in 1981; and a Doctor of Science (Habilitation) degree in Computer Science in 1997.

== Professional career ==
In 1982, Michalewicz left Poland and moved to New Zealand with his wife Ewa and son Matthew Michalewicz. He took a position with Victoria University of Wellington, leaving behind all of his possessions in Poland with the exception of a few personal items. In an interview, he stated that he left Poland for many reasons including the difficult economy at that time and the lack of access to scientific publications to conduct research. He emigrated to Charlotte, North Carolina in July 1989, just prior to Hurricane Hugo. He began working for University of North Carolina at Charlotte where he received an offer of employment one year prior while he was still at the Victoria University. He taught at UNC Charlotte in the Department of Computer Science through 2004.

In 2004, Michalewicz accepted a position with the University of Adelaide as well as the Polish-Japanese School of Information Technology. Michalewicz is currently a professor at the University of Adelaide, the Polish-Japanese School of Information Technology, and the Institute of Computer Science of the Polish Academy of Sciences.

Michalewicz also consulted on data mining and optimisation projects for companies and governmental agencies in the United States, Australia, and Poland. He served as the Chairman of the Technical Committee on Evolutionary Computation and also as the Executive Vice-President of the Institute of Electrical and Electronics Engineers Neural Network Council. He was the general chair of the First IEEE Congress on Evolutionary Computation held in Orlando in June 1994.

=== NuTech Solutions ===
Michalewicz co-founded NuTech Solutions, Inc. in 1999 with his son Matthew. NuTech offered technology solutions to predict business changes and helped companies prepare for these changes. In September 2003, Matthew left the company after resigning from the board of directors.

In 2005, Michalewicz sold his shares of NuTech back to the company to make way for new investments into the company. NuTech was acquired by Netezza Corporation in 2008 and in 2010, IBM Corporation acquired Netezza and became the licensor of the technology licensed by NuTech.

=== SolveIT Software ===
Michalewicz is the co-founder of SolveIT Software which was founded in 2005, a few months after his arrival in Australia. The other co-founders are Matthew Michalewicz, Martin Schmidt, and Constantin Chiriac. All were the co-authors of the book Adaptive Business Intelligence.

The company develops advanced planning and scheduling business optimisation software, which helps manage complex operations using artificial intelligence. Most of the products were initially developed around the key South Australian industries of wine and grain handling, and today SolveIt has a specialist mining division due to early adoption of the companies solutions within the mining market. The software helps companies accurately predict and plan their production, supply chain, shipping and currency hedging.

=== Complexica ===
Complexica, artificial intelligence software provider, was co-founded by Zbigniew and Matthew Michalewicz.

== Publications and lectures ==
=== Select articles ===
Michalewicz has been published in numerous journals including the IEEE Transactions on Evolutionary Computation – TEC.

- Michalewicz, Zbigniew (2011). "Estimating the reproductive potential of offspring in evolutionary heuristics for combinatorial optimization problems". 2011 IEEE Congress of Evolutionary Computation (CEC). pp. 172–178. doi:10.1109/CEC.2011.5949615. ISBN 978-1-4244-7834-7. S2CID 22523653.
- Michalewicz, Zbigniew (2011). "An experimental study of Multi-Objective Evolutionary Algorithms for balancing interpretability and accuracy in fuzzy rulebase classifiers for financial prediction". 2011 IEEE Symposium on Computational Intelligence for Financial Engineering and Economics (CIFEr). pp. 1–6. doi:10.1109/CIFER.2011.5953570. ISBN 978-1-4244-9933-5. S2CID 15003174.
- Michalewicz, Zbigniew (2010). "Adapting to Human Gamers Using Coevolution". Advances in Machine Learning II. Studies in Computational Intelligence. Vol. 263/2010. pp. 75–100. doi:10.1007/978-3-642-05179-1_4. ISBN 978-3-642-05178-4.
- Michalewicz, Zbigniew (2009). "Computational Intelligence for Evolving Trading Rules". IEEE Transactions on Evolutionary Computation. 13: 71–86. doi:10.1109/TEVC.2008.915992. hdl:2440/52599. S2CID 373981.
- Michalewicz, Zbigniew (2008). "Machine intelligence, adaptive business intelligence, and natural intelligence". IEEE Computational Intelligence Magazine. 3: 54–63. doi:10.1109/MCI.2007.913389. hdl:2440/53673. S2CID 62241943.
- Michalewicz, Zbigniew (2003). "A New Dynamical Evolutionary Algorithm Based on Statistical Mechanics". Journal of Computer Science and Technology. 18 (3): 361–368. doi:10.1007/BF02948906. S2CID 20625589.

=== Bibliography ===
Year	Title	Publisher	ISBN
2012	Variants of Evolutionary Algorithms for Real-World Applications	Springer Nature	ISBN 3642234232
2010	How to Solve It: Modern Heuristics	Springer Nature	ISBN 3642061346
2010	Parameter Setting in Evolutionary Algorithms (Studies in Computational Intelligence)	Springer Nature	ISBN 3642088929
2008	Puzzle-Based Learning: Introduction to Critical Thinking, Mathematics, and Problem Solving	Springer Nature	ISBN 1876462639
2008	Simulated Evolution and Learning: 7th International Conference, SEAL 2008, Melbourne, Australia, 7–10 December 2008, Proceedings	Springer Nature	ISBN 3540896937
2008	Design By Evolution: Advances In Evolutionary Design (Natural Computing Series)	Springer Nature	ISBN 3540741097
2008	Advances in Metaheuristics for Hard Optimization	Springer Nature	ISBN 3540729593
2007	Winning Credibility	Hybrid Publishers	ISBN 1876462523
2006	Adaptive Business Intelligence	Springer Nature	ISBN 3540329285
2004	How to Solve It: Modern Heuristics	Springer Nature	ISBN 3540224947
2002	Theoretical Surface Science: A Microscopic Perspective	Springer Nature	ISBN 354043903X
2001	Evolutionary Algorithms in Engineering Applications	Springer Nature	ISBN 3642082823
2000	Advanced Algorithms and Operators	IOP Publishing	ISBN 0750306653
1993	Genetic Algorithms + Data Structures = Evolution Programs	Springer Nature	ISBN 3540606769
1990	Statistical and Scientific Database Management: Fifth International Conference	Springer Nature	ISBN 3540523421

== Awards and recognition ==
Michalewicz was awarded the title of Professor in 2002 by then Polish President Aleksander Kwasniewski. He was appointed as a Business Ambassador for South Australia in 2006 by then Premier Mike Rann. He was also named as a finalist for South Australia's Science Excellence Awards for the commercialisation success of Adapative Business Intelligence in 2008 as well as a 2010 DSI Instructional Innovation Award Competition Finalist.

He was the recipient of the prestigious Pearcey Award which recognises young entrepreneurs in the ICT space that have made significant contributions and taken entrepreneurial risks. He was given the award in 2011 for his founding of SolveIT Software.

== Personal life ==
Michalewicz is married to Ewa Michalewicz, an artist who also did the cover work for Michalewicz's book How To Solve It. Michalewicz has a son, Matthew Michalewicz who is the co-author of some of Zbigniew Michalewicz's books, including Winning Credibility, Puzzle-Based Learning and Adaptive Business Intelligence. Matthew also co-founded SolveIT Software with his father Zbigniew.
