= Jim Goodfellow =

Jim Goodfellow may refer to:

- James Goodfellow (born 1937), Scottish inventor
- James Goodfellow (cricketer) (1850–1924), Australian cricketer
- Jimmy Goodfellow (1943–2020), English footballer and manager
- Jimmy Goodfellow (footballer, born 1938), Scottish footballer
