= Svetha =

Svetha may refer to:

- Svetha Yallapragada Rao American singer
- Svetha Venkatesh Indian computer scientist
