= George Goodfellow =

George Goodfellow may refer to:

- George E. Goodfellow, American physician and naturalist
- George Goodfellow (cricketer), Australian cricketer
