= Main Page =

= Welcome to Wikipedia =
,
the free encyclopedia that anyone can edit.
- 266,512 active editors
- 7,258,544 articles in English

== From today's featured article ==
Title page of the manuscript score

Ich geh und suche mit Verlangen (I go forth and seek with longing), BWV 49, is a church cantata composed by J. S. Bach in 1726, his fourth year in Leipzig. Intended for the twentieth Sunday after Trinity, he first performed it on 3 November that year. The librettist, Christoph Birkmann, based his text on the Sunday's Gospel, the Parable of the Great Banquet. He focused on the wedding feast, taking imagery from the love poetry of the Song of Songs, seen as a dialogue between Jesus and the Soul as his bride. The cantata, in six movements, begins with a sinfonia. Jesus (bass) and the Soul (soprano) perform alternating arias and dialogue recitatives. In the last dialogue, the bride sings a stanza from Nicolai's "Wie schön leuchtet der Morgenstern". The voices are accompanied by oboe d'amore, violoncello piccolo, strings, organ and basso continuo, which Klaus Hofmann summarises: "Bach has clothed his music in the 'wedding garments' of exquisite scoring." (Full article...)

Recently featured:
- Sovetsky Soyuz-class battleship
- Europejara
- Zombie Nightmare

== Did you know ... ==
Fortescue Cuming
- ... that Fortescue Cuming (pictured) gave a "reasonably sane" account of Kentucky after his travels in 1807?
- ... that six people died in floods next to the Cueyamil railway station, on an avenue where residents had previously reported problems with the drainage system?
- ... that organist and choirmaster Albert Ham banned women from singing in the choir of the Cathedral Church of St. James for more than 30 years?
- ... that Nikola Tesla recalled harnessing the power of four cockchafers as one of his first "inventions" as a child?
- ... that a video game modder put an entire video game console inside a video game cartridge?
- ... that, when Razis threw his entrails at enemy soldiers, it implied their defeat despite the act resulting in his death?
- ... that Chow Shu-kai led Taiwan's delegation out of the United Nations General Assembly in 1971 before the assembly voted on China's representation at the UN?
- ... that the Apollo 11 astronauts were added to the Hollywood Walk of Fame for their contributions to the television industry?
- ... that Kate Tolo "could not be more proud" of her boyfriend for tweeting about her vagina?

== Help us improve this article! ==
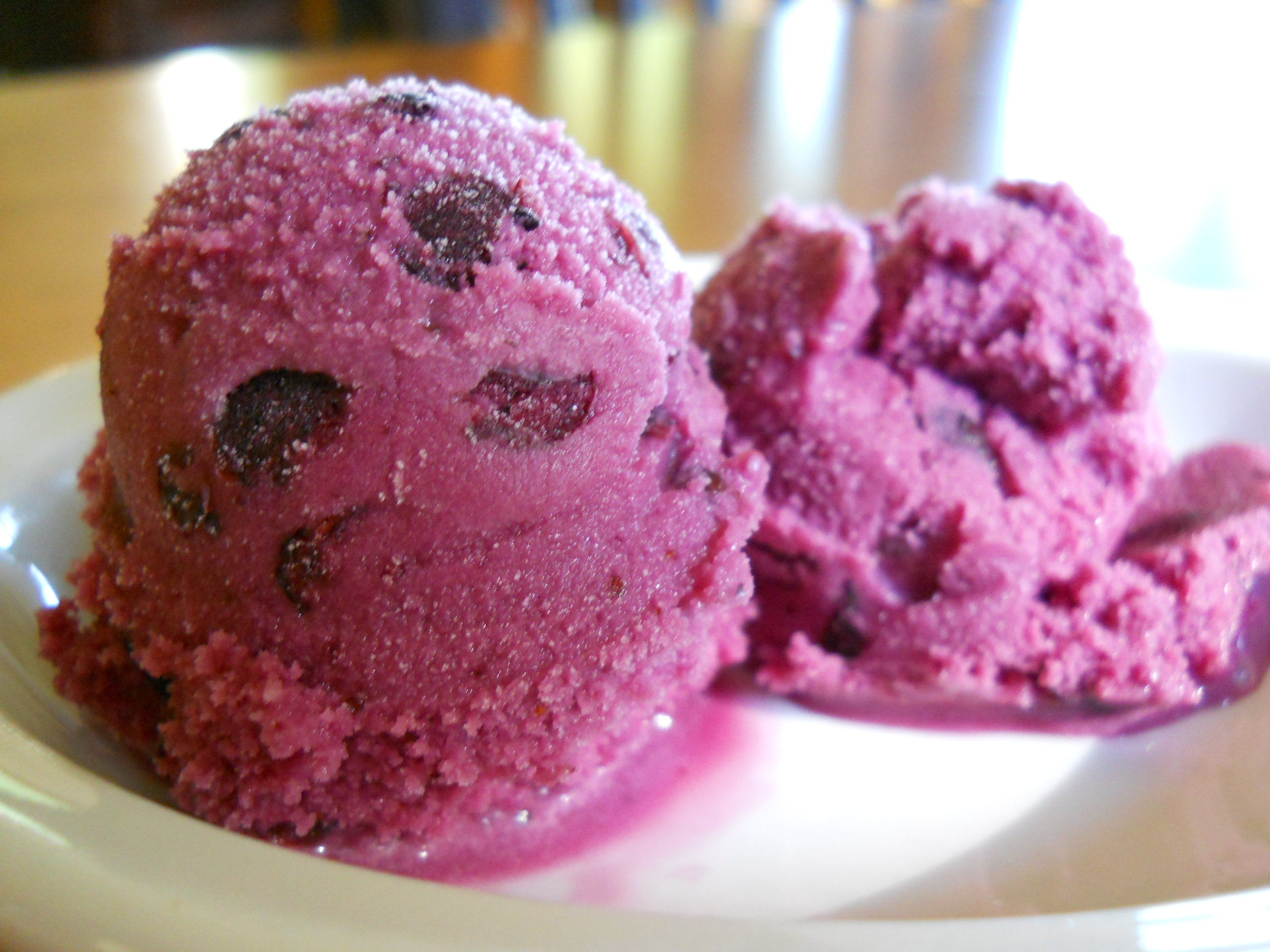
Frozen yogurt, blueberry-flavored
This week's article for improvement is frozen yogurt, a dessert similar to ice cream made with yogurt and sometimes other dairy and non-dairy products.

You can improve this article by:

- Expanding the "Types", "Health", and "Retailing" sections
- Finding reliable sources about production

You can be bold and start editing the article. Have questions or suggestions? Visit the article's talk page, or post at the Teahouse for general discussion.

== In the news ==
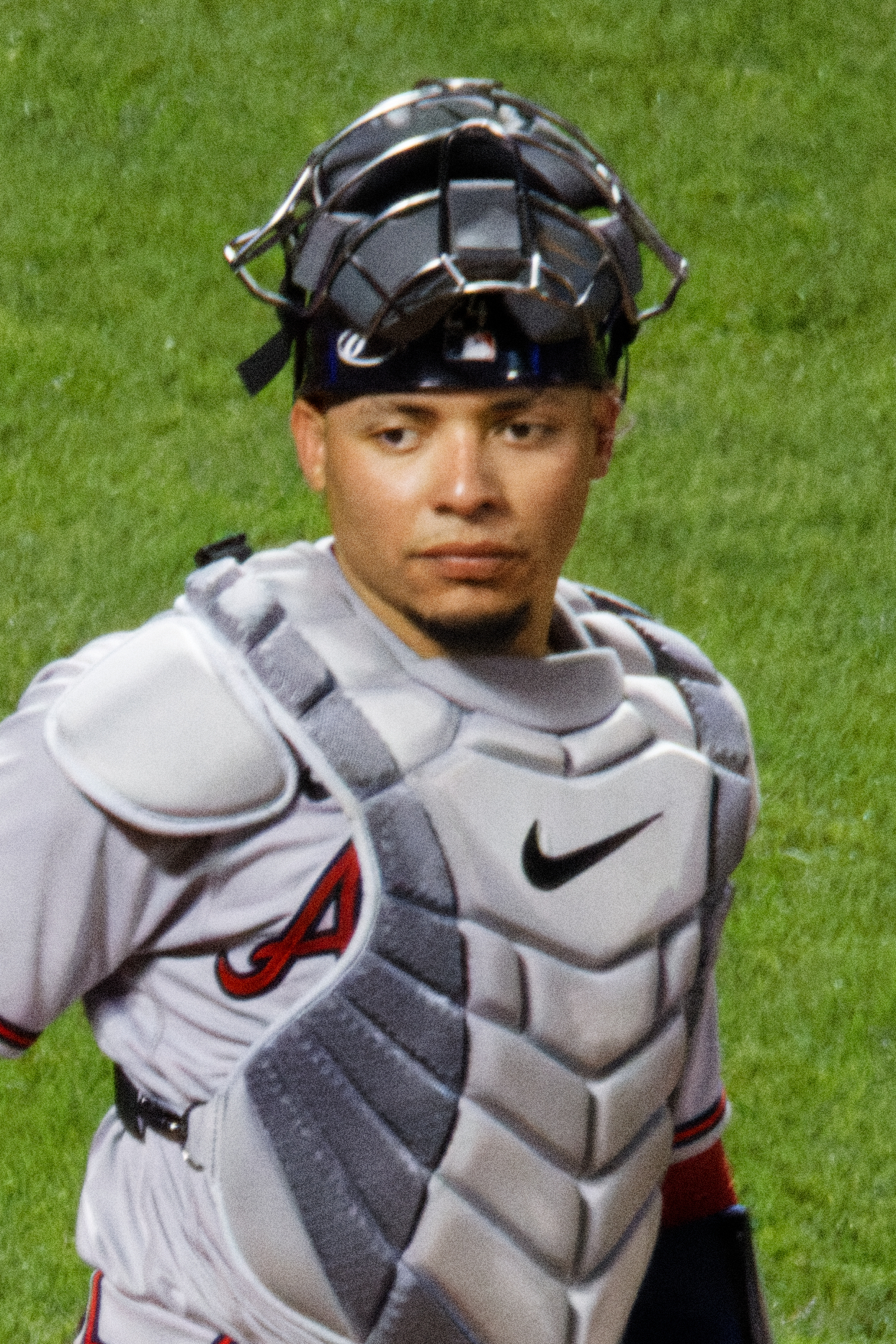
William Contreras
- Digital currency worth US$6.3 billion is stolen from cryptocurrency exchange Binance.
- In baseball, the Milwaukee Brewers defeat the Tampa Bay Rays to win the World Series (MVP William Contreras pictured).
- Mexican politician Cuauhtémoc Cárdenas dies at the age of 92.
- British actor Patrick Stewart dies at the age of 86.
- At least 69 people are killed in a collision between two high-speed trains in Toledo province, Spain.
Ongoing:
- Iran war
- Russo-Ukrainian war
  - timeline
- Yemen offensives
Recent deaths:
- Alfredo Sánchez Monteseirín
- Liu Yandong
- Eric Bauza
- Joseph Lagu
- Judith Blegen
- Dónal Lunny

== On this day ==
November 3: Culture Day in Japan.

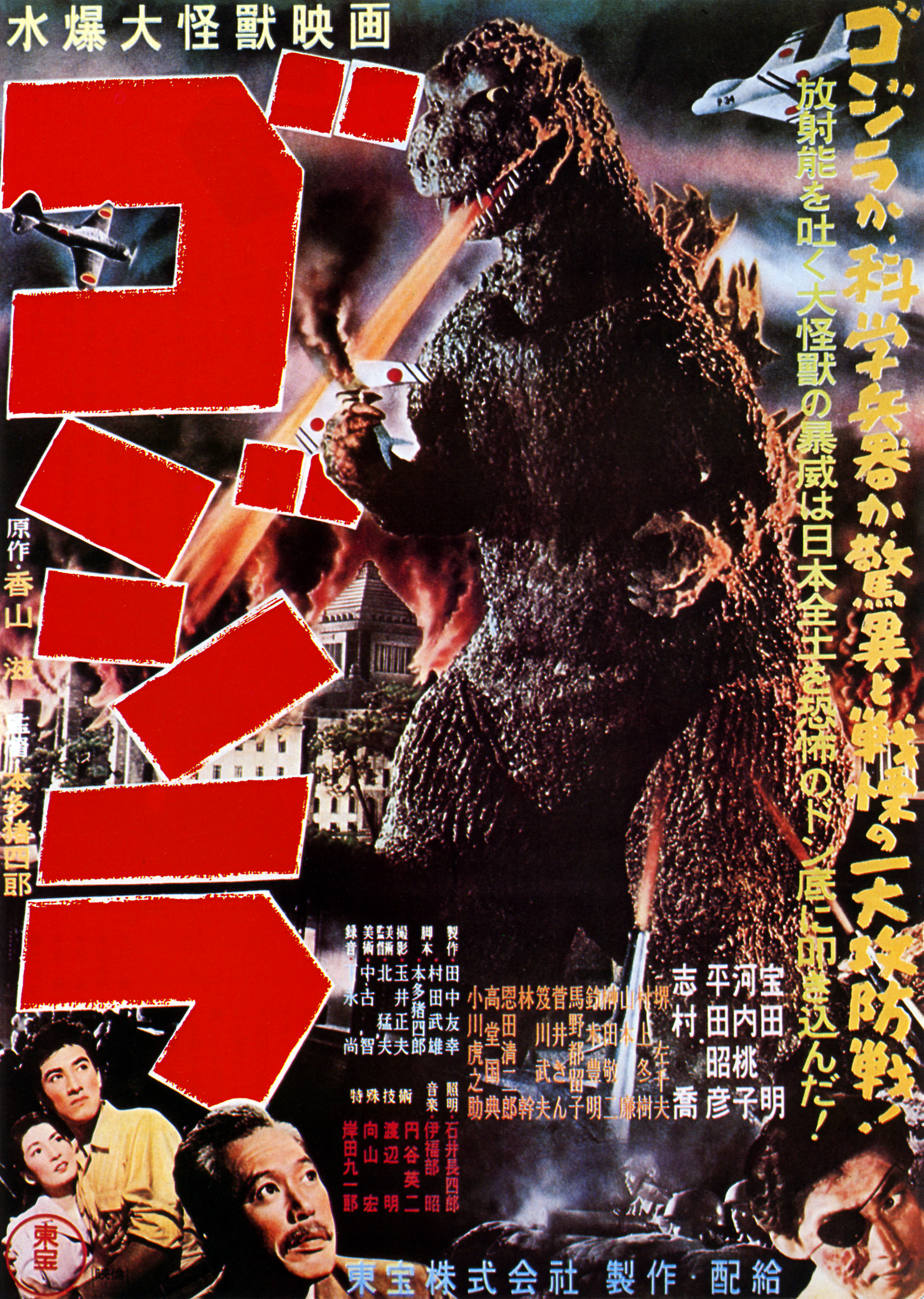
Godzilla film poster
- 1881 – Indigenous Mapuche began an uprising against the occupation of Araucanía by Chile.
- 1943 – The Holocaust: The largest massacre of Jews by German forces began at the Majdanek concentration camp in occupied Poland.
- 1954 – The first film (poster pictured) featuring the giant monster Godzilla was released nationwide in Japan.
- 1996 – Abdullah Çatlı, a leader of the ultra-nationalist Grey Wolves, was killed in a car crash near Susurluk, Turkey, sparking a scandal that exposed the depth of the state's complicity in organized crime.
- Andrew Báthory (d. 1599)
- Bert Jansch (b. 1943)
- Anna Wintour (b. 1949)
- Kim Yong-nam (d. 2025)
More anniversaries:
- November 2
- November 3
- November 4

== Today's featured picture ==
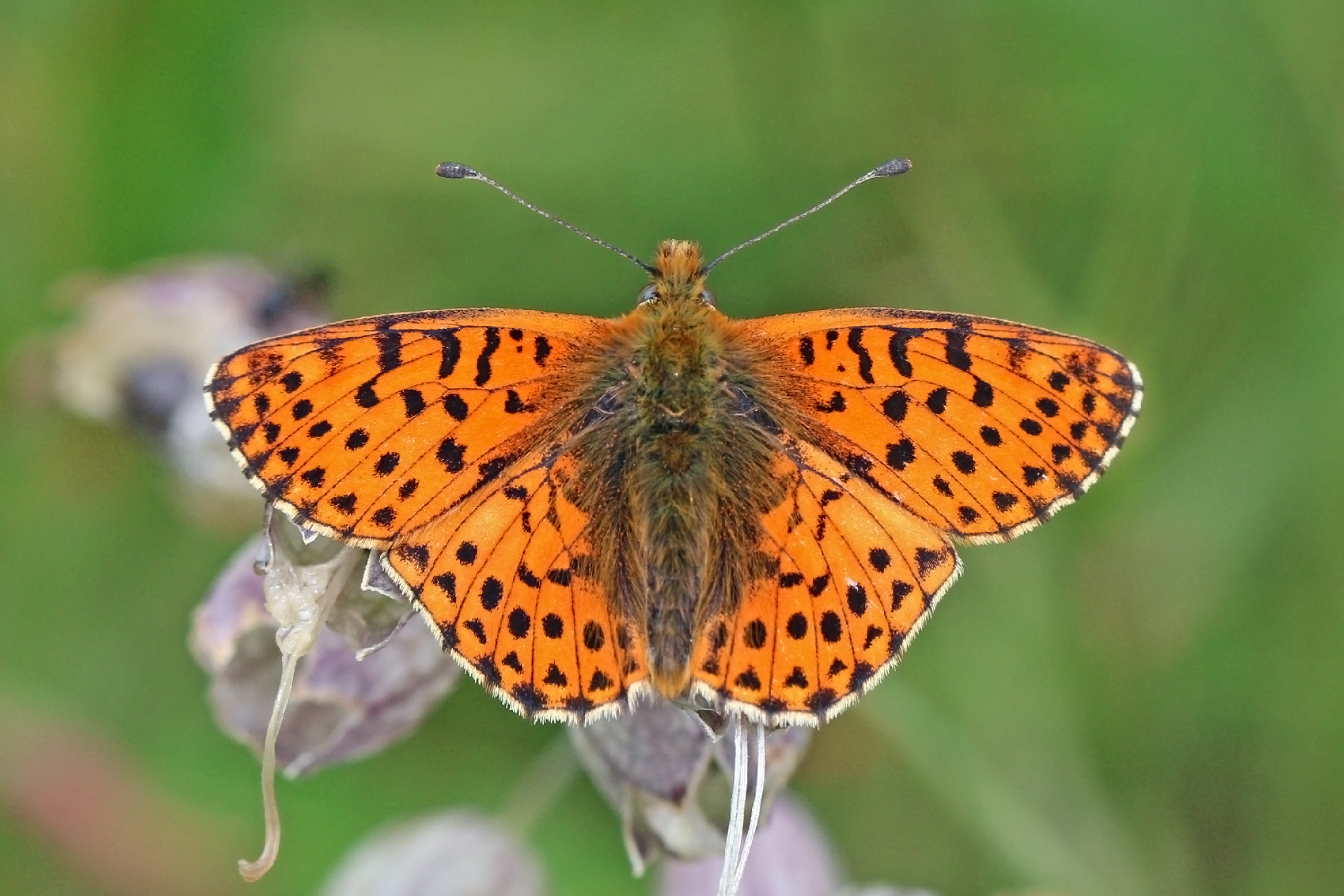

The Balkan fritillary (Boloria graeca) is a butterfly in the family Nymphalidae, found in the Southern Alps and the mid- to high-altitude Balkans in Europe. It inhabits grassy, flower-rich areas, often near the tree line. The upper sides of its wings are orange, with brown markings, rounded spots and lines. The undersides of the hindwings feature silver patterns, with additional greenish marbling in females. This Balkan fritillary of the subspecies B. g. balcanica was photographed in Rila, a mountain range in Bulgaria.

Photograph credit: Charles J. Sharp

Recently featured:
- Mõdriku
- African blue flycatcher
- White Zombie

== Other areas of Wikipedia ==
- Community portal – The central hub for editors, with resources, links, tasks, and announcements.
- Village pump – Forum for discussions about Wikipedia itself, including policies and technical issues.
- Site news – Sources of news about Wikipedia and the broader Wikimedia movement.
- Teahouse – Ask basic questions about using or editing Wikipedia.
- Help desk – Ask questions about using or editing Wikipedia.
- Reference desk – Ask research questions about encyclopedic topics.
- Content portals – A unique way to navigate the encyclopedia.

== Wikipedia's sister projects ==
Wikipedia is written by volunteer editors and hosted by the Wikimedia Foundation, a non-profit organization that also hosts a range of other volunteer projects:

- Commons
  Free media repository
- MediaWiki
  Wiki software development
- Meta-Wiki
  Wikimedia project coordination
- Wikibooks
  Free textbooks and manuals
- Wikidata
  Free knowledge base
- Wikifunctions
  Catalog of computer functions
- Wikiquote
  Collection of quotations
- Wikisource
  Free-content library
- Wikispecies
  Directory of species
- Wikiversity
  Free learning tools
- Wikivoyage
  Free travel guide
- Wiktionary
  Dictionary and thesaurus

== Wikipedia languages ==
This Wikipedia is written in English. Many other Wikipedias are available; some of the largest are listed below.

- 1,000,000+ articles
  - العربية
  - Deutsch
  - Español
  - فارسی
  - Français
  - Italiano
  - Nederlands
  - 日本語
  - Polski
  - Português
  - Русский
  - Svenska
  - Українська
  - Tiếng Việt
  - 中文
- 250,000+ articles
  - Bahasa Indonesia
  - Bahasa Melayu
  - Bân-lâm-gú
  - Български
  - Català
  - Čeština
  - Dansk
  - Eesti
  - Ελληνικά
  - Esperanto
  - Euskara
  - עברית
  - Հայերեն
  - 한국어
  - Magyar
  - Norsk bokmål
  - Română
  - Simple English
  - Slovenčina
  - Srpski
  - Srpskohrvatski
  - Suomi
  - Türkçe
  - Oʻzbekcha
- 50,000+ articles
  - Asturianu
  - Azərbaycanca
  - বাংলা
  - Bosanski
  - کوردی
  - Frysk
  - Gaeilge
  - Galego
  - Hrvatski
  - ქართული
  - Kurdî
  - Latviešu
  - Lietuvių
  - മലയാളം
  - Македонски
  - မြန်မာဘာသာ
  - Norsk nynorsk
  - ਪੰਜਾਬੀ
  - Shqip
  - Slovenščina
  - ไทย
  - తెలుగు
  - اردو
