= Diraq =

Australian quantum computing technology company

- Type: Private
- Industry: Quantum Computing
- Founded: 2022
- Key people: Andrew Dzurak (CEO & Founder), Scott A. McGregor (Chair)
- Number of employees: 150
- Website: https://www.diraq.com/

Diraq is a quantum computing company developing quantum computers based on silicon spin qubits. The company was founded in 2022 as a spin-out from Australian university UNSW Sydney and is led by physicist and engineer Andrew Dzurak. In November 2025, Diraq was selected by DARPA to advance to Stage B of the Quantum Benchmarking Initiative (QBI), a program evaluating whether quantum computing approaches can achieve utility-scale operation by 2033. Diraq's technology is based on silicon spin qubits fabricated using standard CMOS semiconductor manufacturing processes, aiming to enable large-scale quantum computing by integrating millions of qubits on a single chip.

== History ==
Diraq was founded in 2022 by Andrew Dzurak, a Scientia Professor at UNSW Sydney, following more than two decades of research in silicon-based quantum computing. Dzurak's research group at UNSW had published foundational work on silicon spin qubits, including the first-ever demonstration that silicon-CMOS transistors could be reconfigured to perform quantum logic, in Nature and Science group journals.

Diraq has raised capital through Series A funding involving investors such as Quantonation, a venture capital fund specializing in quantum technologies, In-Q-Tel, Allectus Capital, Main Sequence Ventures, Uniseed, NewSouth Innovations, Morgan Creek Digital. In February 2026, Diraq received AU$20 million as a strategic equity investment from Australia's National Reconstruction Fund Corporation (NRFC), bringing total venture funding raised to over US$100 million.

In addition to private capital, Diraq has secured grants from the US Army Research Office, as well as Australian Government grants including the CRC-P and QCCF.

In April 2025, Diraq was selected by DARPA for Stage A of the QBI, a program established to rigorously evaluate whether quantum computing approaches can deliver more economic value than their construction and operating costs by the early 2030s. Of the 17 teams initially participating in Stage A, only 11, including Diraq, advanced to Stage B in November 2025.

In May 2026, Diraq will receive up to $38 million in planned funding under the CHIPS and Science Act to develop and scale quantum logic units and accelerate critical manufacturing and integration capabilities for silicon spin quantum computing technologies, including novel designs for large-scale and reliable qubit arrays.

In June 2026, Diraq appointed former Broadcom CEO, Scott A. McGregor, as Chairman.

== Technology ==
Diraq's approach is based on silicon spin qubits, which encode quantum information in the spin of individual electrons confined in quantum dots formed in silicon. These quantum dots are created using structures derived from conventional silicon transistors, allowing the qubits to be fabricated using CMOS-compatible processes at existing semiconductor foundries.

In September 2025, Diraq and imec, a European research and innovation hub in nanoelectronics and digital technologies, reported results in Nature showing that silicon spin qubits fabricated on imec's 300-mm industrial platform achieved fidelities exceeding 99% for both single-qubit and two-qubit gate operations. These fidelity thresholds are necessary for implementing quantum error correction, a requirement for fault-tolerant quantum computing. The study emphasized reproducibility across randomly selected devices from multiple fabrication runs rather than performance achieved only on specially optimized samples, demonstrating the industrial viability of the approach.

In June 2025, Diraq reported the successful integration of cryogenic CMOS control electronics operating at millikelvin temperatures with its silicon spin qubits. This work, conducted in collaboration with Emergence Quantum, a company formed by former members of Microsoft Research, demonstrated that classical control circuits can be placed in close proximity to qubits at cryogenic temperatures without degrading qubit performance. This integration is intended to reduce wiring complexity and improve scalability in future quantum systems.

Diraq has also reported that its silicon spin qubits can operate at temperatures above 1 kelvin, significantly higher than the operating temperatures typically required for superconducting qubits, which is expected to simplify cryogenic refrigeration requirements.

== Partnerships ==
Diraq has established partnerships with semiconductor manufacturers and technology organizations as part of its development program. These include GlobalFoundries for CMOS-based fabrication development and imec for advanced silicon manufacturing and 300-millimeter wafer processing. Diraq is partnered with Fermilab on the US Department of Energy (DOE) funded Quandarum project.

The company collaborates with NVIDIA on hybrid quantum-classical computing, including integration with NVIDIA's CUDA-Q software platform and NVQLink interface technology. Diraq also works with Dell Technologies on system integration and data-center infrastructure as part of its DARPA QBI consortium activities.

Diraq's DARPA consortium partners include Riverlane, Emergence Quantum, Iceberg Quantum, Quantum Machines, the Centre for Quantum Software and Information at the University of Technology Sydney, and the University of Wisconsin–Madison.

== Operations ==
Founded in Sydney, Australia, Diraq's research and development facilities are in Sydney, Australia, with US headquarters located in Palo Alto, California. The company maintains operations in Boston, Chicago, Los Angeles, and Melbourne. As of early 2026, Diraq reported employing more than 100 employees across Australia and the United States.

== Recognition and awards ==
=== Company recognition ===
Nature Index ranked Diraq first among Australian corporate institutions for scientific output in top-tier research journals in 2025.

In August 2025, Diraq won the Technology Platform category at the NSW iAwards, an Australian technology industry awards program run by the Australian Information Industry Association, which recognized innovation and commercialization.

In November 2024, Diraq won the Defence, Dual-Use Technology and Space category at the InnovationAus 2024 Awards for Excellence for its technological advancements in quantum computing.

=== Founder recognition ===
In November 2025, Andrew Dzurak, Diraq's CEO and founder, received the Innovation Leadership Award at the InnovationAus 2025 Awards for Excellence, recognizing his contributions to silicon-based quantum computing and leadership in translating research into commercial technology.

Andrew Dzurak was named as part of the Quantum 100 list compiled by the International Year of Quantum Science and Technology (IYQ 2025) committee, which sought to recognize individuals advancing the understanding and development of quantum technologies.

In November 2024, Andrew Dzurak was inducted into the Pearcey Hall of Fame, an honor recognising distinguished lifetime achievement and contribution to the development and growth of the information and communications technology industry in Australia.

== See also ==
- Quantum computing
- Spin qubit quantum computer
- Silicon quantum dot
- Semiconductor device fabrication
