= SolveIT Software =

Australian enterprise software provider

SolveIT Software Pty Ltd
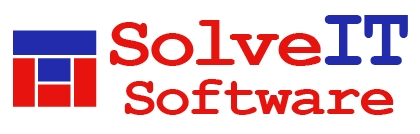
- Type: Subsidiary
- Industry: Supply chain optimization Predictive software Mine Planning
- Founded: 2005
- Founder: Matthew Michalewicz, Zbigniew Michalewicz, Martin Schmidt, Constantin Chiriac
- Headquarters: Adelaide, Australia
- Number of locations: Adelaide, Melbourne, Brisbane, Perth, Chişinău
- Area served: Global
- Key people: Zbigniew Michalewicz (Chairman & CSO); Roland Spitty (CEO)
- Products: Business optimisation through deployment of advanced planning and scheduling software to predict and plan: production; supply chain; shipping; and currency hedging
- Services: Supply chain consulting, IT roadmaps, Data mining and analytics
- Number of employees: 150 (2011)
- Parent: Schneider Electric
- Divisions: Software, Mining, Bulk material handling, Science, Services
- Website: solveitsoftware.com

SolveIT Software Pty Ltd is a provider of advanced planning and scheduling enterprise software for supply and demand optimisation and predictive modelling. Based in Adelaide, South Australia, 70% of its turnover is generated from software deployed in the mining and bulk material handling sectors.

== History ==
The company was established in 2005 by four academics who were also experienced business people, all recent immigrants to Australia. The team was headed by ex-EY consultant Matthew Michalewicz, who had moved to Adelaide in 2004 after selling his last company, NuTech Solutions. The other three partners were Zbigniew Michalewicz PhD, Martin Schmidt and Constantin Chiriac, all four of which were co-authors of the book Adaptive Business Intelligence.

The company first developed an optimization and predictive modeling platform based on Artificial Intelligence, and then built its supply chain applications for planning, scheduling, and demand forecasting on this platform. Early customers included Orlando Wines, ABB Grain, the Fosters wine brands and later Pernod Ricard that were also located in the Barossa Valley region.

In 2008, Rio Tinto asked the company to improve its mining planning and scheduling operations based in the Pilbara. SolveIT succeeded in applying its advanced planning and scheduling product, based on non-linear optimization, to the Rio Tinto mine scheduling problem, after many other vendors had failed over a period of ten years.

With 30 employees at this point, it then won an additional contract in the mining sector with the BHP Mitsubishi Alliance, leading to subsequent tender wins in the sector, including: BHP, CBH Group, Fortescue, Hills Holdings, Pacific National and Xstrata.

On 3 September 2012, SolveIT announced it was acquired by Schneider Electric, a global specialist in energy management.

== Operations ==
Headquartered in Adelaide, the company has over 150 staff based across operational offices in: Melbourne; Brisbane; Perth and Chişinău, Moldova.

The company develops advanced planning and scheduling business optimisation software, which helps manage complex operations using artificial intelligence. Most of the products were initially developed around the key South Australian industries of wine and grain handling, and today SolveIt has a specialist mining division due to early adoption of the company's software within the mining market. The software helps companies accurately predict and plan their production, supply chain, shipping and currency hedging.

Due to the scientific optimisation components embedded in the company's software products, it sometimes uses a prize-based system to recruit the required high-level of talent. In 2011, the company used a Magic square problem, won by University of Nottingham graduate Yuri Bykov, who developed a program which solved a constrained version of a 2600 by 2600 magic square within a minute.

In 2011, the company won the Australian National iAward in the e-Logistics and Supply Chain category for its Supply Chain Network Optimiser (SCNO). In February 2012, SolveIT and Schneider Electric became co-organisers of the Integrated Planning and Optimisation Summit, held at the Adelaide Convention Centre.

== Products/Services ==
- Advanced Planning & Scheduling (APS): Enterprise software for optimising complex planning and scheduling activities, especially those that are heavily constrained or require multi-stage processing. To allow for optimisation of a wide variety of planning and scheduling activities, APS can include variable inputs covering specific constraints, business rules, and processes. It is deployed in planning for production, workforce, maintenance and equipment scheduling.
- Supply Chain Network Optimisation (SCNO): a whole-of-supply-chain system based on proprietary non-linear optimisation, prediction, and what-if analysis. Capable of managing and optimising complete operational and strategic supply chain activities, it claims to cut transportation costs, working capital requirements, and stock outs. SCNO was named as a finalist for 2012 Supply Chain Distinction Awards, to be held in Berlin in June 2012.
- Demand Planning & Forecasting (DPF): based on multiple prediction algorithms and techniques, DPF can be applied to: replenishment; promotions and incentives; pricing and discounting; cross selling and upselling; product churn.
- Predictive Modelling: based on a combination of both classical forecasting methods and new, non-traditional prediction technologies, which are tuned to each customers business requirements and circumstances. The service includes project planning, data validation, model training and calibration, onsite support, and parallel running.
- Technology Platforms: based on proprietary adaptive technologies that work competitively and cooperatively together as a "hybrid system", it claims to produce more accurate forecasts and optimal schedule and plans in less time. The technology is at the centre of Adaptive Business Intelligence, which allows the systems and predictive models to "learn" from previous experiences and "self-validate" as changes occur in the customers marketplace.
- Services: cover supply chain consulting, IT roadmaps, and data mining and analytics.

The company's mining division provides integrated planning, scheduling and optimisation for the whole traditional mining supply chain network of mine, process plant, transport network, port and trading desk. Variables into the systems allow for asset management, workforce variability, maintenance, accommodation and market factors.

== Publications ==
- Zbigniew Michalewicz, Martin Schmidt, Matthew Michalewicz, Constantin Chiriac (10 November 2006). Adaptive Business Intelligence. Springer Publishing. ISBN 3540329285.
