= Matthew Michalewicz =

Australian entrepreneur (born 1976)

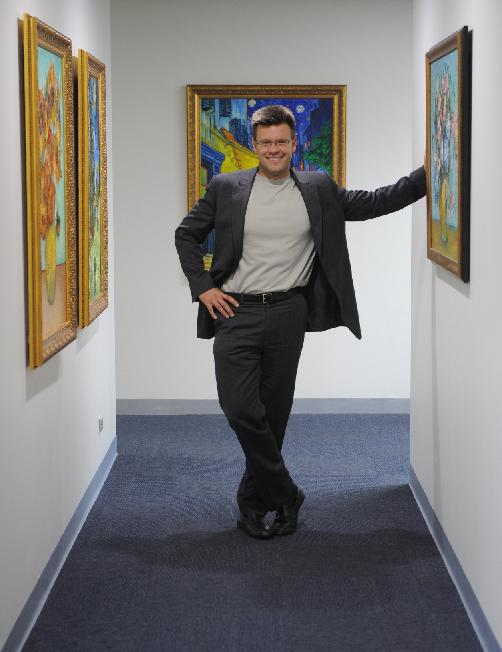
- Born: 1976 (age 49–50)
- Education: B.S. Business Administration & Corporate Finance
- Alma mater: University of North Carolina at Charlotte
- Occupation: Ceo
- Organization: www.complexica.com
- Known for: NuTech Solutions, co-Founder; SolveIT Software, co-Founder; Complexica, co-Founder
- Awards: 2011 SA Pearcey Entrepreneur Award
- Website: www.michalewicz.com.au

Matthew Michalewicz (born 1976) is a Polish entrepreneur and author with experience in the fields of technology, commercialization and supply chain management. He is the co-author of a number of books and publications, some of which have been adapted into courses on problem solving in colleges and universities. He is the co-founder of NuTech Solutions (founded in 1999), SolveIT Software (founded in 2004), and Complexica (founded in 2014), companies that he started with his father Zbigniew Michalewicz. In 2012, SolveIT Software Pty Ltd, was acquired by Schneider Electric.

Michalewicz is a speaker and has given keynote speeches for organizations on topics of personal motivation, success and entrepreneurship. He is also a fellow and/or a member of the board or advisor for organizations including the University of Adelaide. While the CEO of NuTech Solutions, he was appointed to the UNC-Charlotte's Business Advisory Council for the Belk College of Business Administration. He has received awards including the Outstanding Young Alumnus Award and the 2011 SA Pearcey Entrepreneur Award.

== Early life and education ==
Matthew Michalewicz was born in 1976 in Poland, the son of Zbigniew Michalewicz, an author and professor.

His grandfather had originally emigrated to the United States in 1910, but Matthew's mother visited Poland in 1939 and became trapped in the country due to World War II. In 1982, his family fled from communist Poland to New Zealand but came to the United States in 1989 when his father became chairman of the UNC Charlotte's computer science department.

Michalewicz earned a degree in financial management from UNC in 1998

== Career ==
Michalewicz launched his first business when he was 18 years old, which was a personal training company called Fitness Forever. After finishing college, he joined Ernst & Young as a management consultant, and later left to start a money management company with Dan Cullen, a former Edward Jones money manager.

=== NuTech Solutions ===
In 1999, Michalewicz co-founded NuTech Solutions, Inc. with his father and Dan Cullen, where he worked as the company's president and chief executive until 2003. With the help of Cullen, he was able to raise $15 Million in private funds from angel investors. He incorporated the company in 1999 and began to absorb other companies in locations such as Charlotte, Denver, Poland, Germany, and Japan. During his time with NuTech, he helped grow the company to 150 employees (30 of whom had doctorates). The company also planned to file for an initial public offering but abandoned the plan after the stock market crash of 2000.

The software developed by NuTech Solutions used artificial intelligence to boost the efficiency of client's manufacturing, distribution, and customer service. The software was used by Ford Motor Company to help find profitable ways to sell off-lease cars and by Bank of America to help fight credit card fraud. Former Bank of America CEO Hugh McColl also invested personally into NuTech Solutions and served on the company's board of directors. NuTech was purchased by Netezza Corporation in 2008, and Netezza was later acquired by IBM.

=== SolveIT Software ===
Michalewicz co-founded SolveIT Software in 2004, a year after his arrival in Australia. The other co-founders are Zbigniew Michalewicz, Martin Schmidt, and Constantine Chiriac. All were the co-authors of the book Adaptive Business Intelligence. Several employees from NuTech also came to join the new company including NuTech board member and former president of Poland Lech Wales. The company develops advanced planning and scheduling optimization software, which helps manage complex operations using artificial intelligence. Most of the products were initially developed around the key South Australian industries of wine and grain handling, and today SolveIt has a specialist mining division due to early adoption of the company's products within the mining market. The software helps companies optimize their production, logistics, maintenance, and workforce activities.

During his time at SolveIT, Michalewicz has grown the company to approximately 150 employees and 5 international offices. He also secured contracts with many companies including Rio Tinto, BHP, Fortescue, Xstrata, BMA Coal and Incitec Pivot.

In September 2012, SolveIT Software was purchased by Schneider Electric. As part of the purchase, it was announced that the software systems owned by SolveIT would be integrated into Schneider's MES software to create a single platform. It was also announced that Michalewicz would stay with the company after the acquisition was complete.

=== Complexica ===
Michalewicz co-founded Complexica in 2014, which is a leading provider of Artificial Intelligence software. The company's core product – an AI-based software robot called Larry, the Digital Analyst – can help organisations increase revenue, margin, and productivity using automated analytics.

== Awards ==
Michalewicz has received numerous awards and recognitions throughout his career. He received the Outstanding Young Alumnus Award from the University of North Carolina in 2002. The award is presented annually to a former UNC graduate who shows exceptional service to the UNC Charlotte community and the Alumni Association. He received recognition in 2003 when he was announced as a finalist for the Ernst and Young Entrepreneur of the Year Award. He was the winner of the 2011 SA Pearcey Entrepreneur Award. The award was presented to him by Wayne Fitzsimmons and Brenda Aynsley of the Pearcey Foundation.

== Speaking engagements ==
Michalewicz is a regular keynote speaker. He speaks on personal motivation and success, entrepreneurship, commercialization, and supply chain management. He led the keynote panel of speakers at the Next Generation Mining Summit in Australia in November 2011. He has also given keynote speeches for The Commonwealth Bank of Australia, the Department of Economic Development, the Financial Association of Australia, Saxton Speakers Bureau, the University of South Australia, and the Venture Capital Board of South Australia.

== Works ==
Michalewicz is the co-author of four books on various business topics. His first book, Adaptive Business Intelligence, was published in 2006. He co-authored the book with Zbigniew Michalewicz. The book was published by Springer and contains information about predicting the future of business environments including subjects such as data mining, predictive modeling, forecasting, optimization, and adaptability. In 2007, he co-authored his second book entitled Winning Credibility. The book was published by Hybrid Publishers and is a book that gives advice to new entrepreneurs on challenges that they face when starting a business. His third book, Puzzle-Based Learning, was released in 2008. The book contains teaching and learning methods that are designed to develop problem-solving skills. The book was developed into an educational program and has a website where people can log in and take the course. The book is also used as a textbook in numerous college and university courses. His fourth book, Life in Half a Second, was released in 2013. The book discusses the five fundamental factors that are scientifically proven to drive success in life and business, how each factor works, and how the reader can apply them.

His published works include:

- Adaptive Business Intelligence, 2006, Springer, (Co-Author with Zbigniew Michalewicz, Constantine Chiriac and Martin Schmidt) ISBN 3540329285
- Winning Credibility, 2007, Hybrid Publishers, (Co-Author with Zbigniew Michalewicz) ISBN 1876462523
- Puzzle Based Learning: Introduction To Critical Thinking, Mathematics, and Problem Solving, 2008, Hybrid Publishers, (Co-Author with Zbigniew Michalewicz) ISBN 1876462639
- Life in Half a Second: How To Achieve Success Before Its Too Late, 2013, Hybrid Publishers, ISBN 1925000206
