= James Channel =

Retro gaming YouTube channel

- James Channel's YouTube profile picture

YouTube information
- Channel: James Channel
- Years active: 2023–present
- Genre: Video game console modifications
- Subscribers: 450 thousand
- Views: 64.8 million
- Last updated: 11 November, 2026

James Channel (Note: Stylized in graphics as James channel) is a YouTube channel and an online alias. The channel, which is run by video game hardware modder James, who is known for making unconventional modifications to retro video game consoles and hardware. He first gained attention in 2024, after making his own Nintendo PlayStation, and the channel's content has received media attention from many video game outlets including Kotaku, PC Gamer, and GameSpot.

== Content ==
The content of James Channel mainly revolves around James performing unconventional modifications on retro video game console hardware. James's first video to gather significant attention was posted in January 2024, when he attempted to recreate the unreleased Sony PlayStation prototype. In this video, he put a first-generation PlayStation motherboard inside a Super Famicom (SNES) shell, resulting in the disk storage being exposed from the SNES's cartridge slot.

In March 2024, James put an entire Nintendo Entertainment System (NES) console into a NES cartridge. He did this by using the plastic shell of a cartridge and putting a Famiclone inside it. The console's power is supplied by a Micro USB port and it also features a headphone jack. In August 2024, he hot glued a CRT screen on to the original Game Boy handheld. Due to the power needed for the CRT screen, the total battery life lasted two minutes and five seconds.

On September 16, 2025, James posted a 33-minute video where he turned the first-generation Xbox home console into a handheld one. This video took over three weeks to make, due to technical issues. He used hot glue, duct tape and super glue for the project. The total battery life, which was powered by a 20-year-old iPod dock, lasted 9 minutes and 40 seconds. In May 2026, he repeated this feat with a PlayStation 2 console, turning that into a handheld as well.

In July 2026, James criticized Nintendo for not making a Virtual Boy controller for the Nintendo Switch 2, which would correspond with the release of Virtual Boy games on to the Nintendo Switch Online service. He went on to make his own wireless Virtual Boy controller for the Nintendo Switch 2.

== Reception ==
James's content has received media attention from many video game journalists. Outlets that have covered the channel include: Kotaku, PC Gamer, GameSpot, Engadget, and GamesRadar+. His content was noted for its absurdity. James Bentley of PC Gamer said "It's not often I find myself chuckling at DIY projects, but YouTuber James Channel got a hearty one from me," noting the part where James saws an Xbox in half for his video.

Zack Zwiezen of Kotaku said James' Xbox handheld was the "most dangerous handheld" as its exposed disk drive meant that the spinning game disk was dangerously close to the user's hands, and described the video of the build as "fantastic". Damien McFerran of Time Extension said the process of him creating the CRT Game Boy was "completely intentional and very amusing [and] scary to watch." McFerran later said in an article about the NES cartridge console that "James Channel doesn't put much stock in the idea of 'planning ahead', but in all honesty, that just makes things more interesting." Anthony Wallace of Retro Dodo said that the exposed disk drive on his Nintendo PlayStation was "frightening". Overall, Wallace said "the work by James Channel reminds us of the unique history in how our favorite video game consoles became a reality."

== See also ==
- DankPods
- pannenkoek2012
