= Andrew Dzurak =

Australian physicist and engineer

Andrew Steven Dzurak
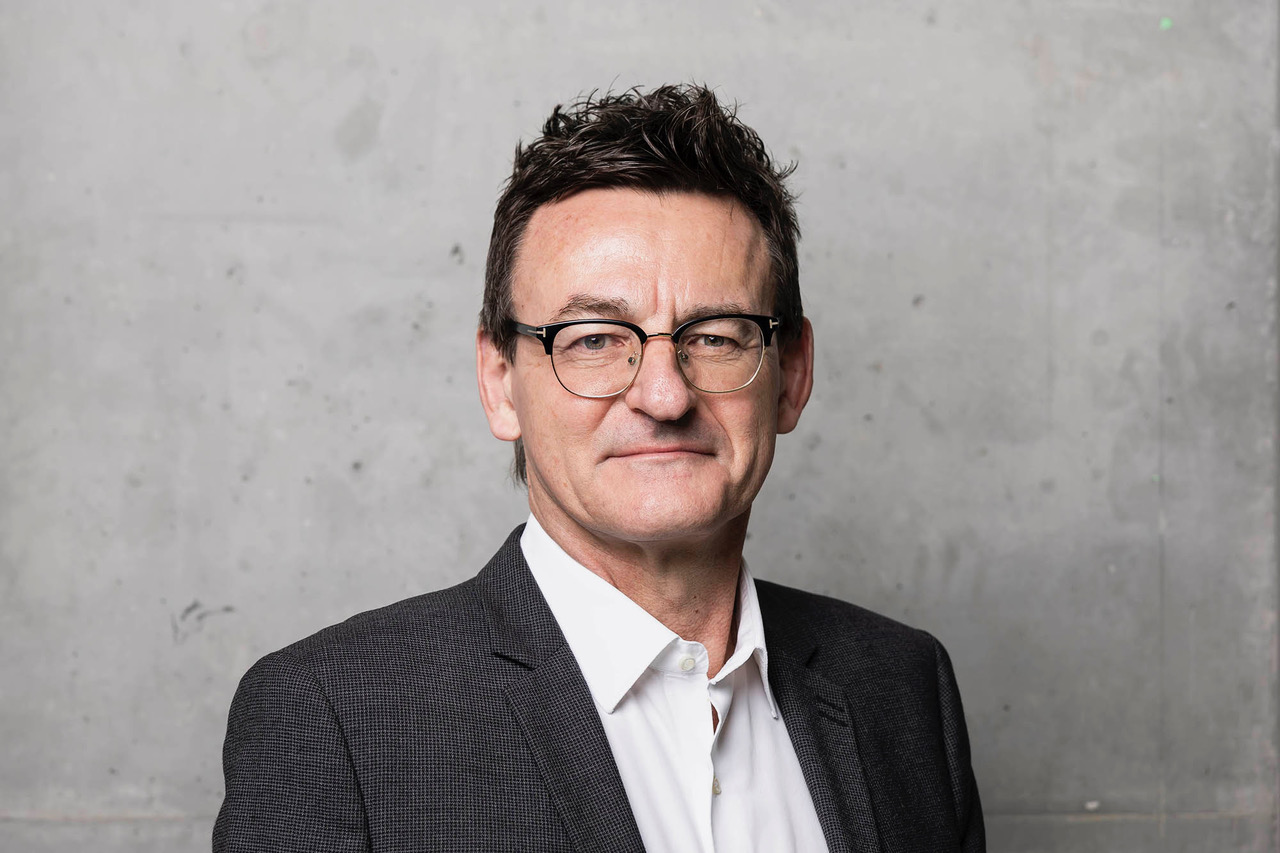
- Andrew Dzurak
- Education: University of Cambridge, PhD; University of Sydney, BSc (Hons) & University Medal
- Awards: Fellow of the American Physical Society (2026); Walter Boas Medal (2026); Fellow of the Australian Academy of Science (2026); Pearcey Hall of Fame inductee (2024); ARC Laureate Fellowship (2019); Fellow of the Royal Society of New South Wales (2015); Eureka Prize for Scientific Research (2011)
- Scientific career
- Fields: Quantum physics; Quantum Computing
- Workplaces: University of New South Wales; University of Cambridge; University of Sydney
- Thesis: Ballistic hot-electrons in mesoscopic transistors (1993)
- Doctoral advisor: Professor Sir Michael Pepper, FRS
- Website: https://research.unsw.edu.au/people/scientia-professor-andrew-dzurak; diraq.com

Andrew Dzurak is an Australian physicist and engineer, known for his work in quantum computing. He is the CEO and founder of Diraq, a start-up that is developing a scalable quantum computer based on single electron spins in silicon. He is a Scientia Professor in Quantum Engineering at the University of New South Wales (UNSW), an ARC Laureate Fellow and a member of the executive board of the Sydney Quantum Academy.

== Education ==
Dzurak completed his Bachelor of Science at the University of Sydney in 1987. He then earned his PhD in experimental physics from the University of Cambridge in 1993, under the supervision of Professor Sir Michael Pepper, FRS.

== Research ==
While in Cambridge, Dzurak studied hot electron and ballistic transport in various semiconductor nanostructures, including quantum point contact and quantum dot systems, which were then newly discovered. He also became an expert in the fabrication and low-temperature measurement of nanoelectronic devices, skills that he applied upon his return to Australia.

In 1994, Dzurak took up a Vice-Chancellor's Research Fellowship in the School of Physics at the UNSW, followed by an ARC Postdoctoral Research Fellowship in 1996. He was the founding Director (2007–2022) of ANFF–NSW, the NSW node of the Australian National Fabrication Facility. He was also instrumental in setting up the ARC Centre for Quantum Computer Technology, which was established by Professor Robert Clark in January 2000, and now maintains the world's largest focused collaboration on silicon-based quantum computing.

In the late-1990s, Andrew began research on single-atom spin-based quantum bits (qubits). Together with his colleague Andrea Morello, Dzurak demonstrated real-time readout of the quantum state of a single electron spin in silicon in 2010, followed by the world's first silicon qubits in 2012. Since then, Dzurak has developed a naturally scalable qubit technology by reconfiguring the CMOS transistors that make up standard silicon processor chips.

== Diraq ==
In May 2022, Dzurak founded Diraq to commercialize the patent portfolio he had developed at UNSW and to work toward building a utility-scale quantum computer.

== Awards ==
- H S Carslaw Memorial Scholarship, University of Sydney (1987)
- Cambridge Australia Scholarship, Cambridge Commonwealth Trust (1988)
- Vice-Chancellor's Research Fellowship, University of New South Wales (1994)
- ARC Postdoctoral Research Fellowship, Australian Research Council (1996)
- Eureka Prize for Scientific Research (2011)
- NSW Govt. Award for Excellence in Engineering and Information and Communications Technologies (2012)
- Best New Invention, UNSW Innovation Awards (2014)
- “Top Ten Breakthroughs of 2015”, Physics World, UK (2015)
- Elected Fellow, Royal Society of New South Wales (2015)
- ARC Laureate Fellowship (2019)
- Quantum Alliance Award, American Chamber of Commerce in Australia (2023)
- Pearcey Hall of Fame inductee (2024)
- Elected Fellow of the Australian Academy of Science (2026)
- Walter Boas Medal for Excellence in Research (2026)
- Elected Fellow of the American Physical Society (2026)
