= DankPods =

Australian YouTuber and musician

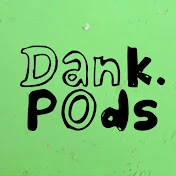
- YouTube avatar

Background information
- Born: Wade Leslie Nixon; January 1, 1990 (age 36); Adelaide, South Australia, Australia
- Occupations: YouTuber; musician
- Instruments: Drums; DAW
- Years active: 2014—present
- Label: Dankcrest
- Website: dingusland.fun

YouTube information
- Years active: 2019—present
- Genres: Technology; Comedy
- Subscribers: 1.85 million
- Views: 519.08 million
- Last updated: 18 September 2026

Wade Leslie Nixon (born January 1, 1990), known online primarily as DankPods, is an Australian YouTuber and musician who became popular with technology showcases and reviews on his YouTube channel. Based in Adelaide, his channel mainly reviews and showcases consumer-based technology devices with a heavy focus on old low-end portable media players and headphone reviews. Originally, the channel was dedicated exclusively to content around iPods, hence the name, but has since expanded to more general technology videos.

Known for his witty and impromptu humour and chaotic style, Wade has amassed 1.85 million subscribers and 519 million views on the DankPods channel as of July 2026. He has also created several other YouTube channels in the same vein as DankPods such as Garbage Time, a car channel with a more vlogger-esque style, and The Drum Thing, dedicated to showcasing drums.

== Background ==
Wade Nixon was born in 1990 in Adelaide, South Australia, though was raised in the country outside the metropolis with his siblings. Around the age of 8, Nixon wanted to play the drums after being impressed by a friends' playing ability, and began to study the instrument. Nixon also developed a passion for cars and motorbikes. He worked various jobs as a teenager, including as a farm-hand and concreter. During school, Nixon tested expensive headphones, which he states made him an audiophile.

In 2011, Nixon moved into the city and attended the University of South Australia studying Jazz Philosophy. Nixon's father passed away whilst he was completing his degree. Nixon had attempted various YouTube channels mostly about drums but found minimal success. After completing his degree, Nixon worked as a secondary school music teacher while living out of cheap rental homes with various roommates and struggling to earn a stable income. He simultaneously worked as a gigging musician playing for all kinds of music acts. He also repaired and resold motorbikes and iPods as a side hustle.

Nixon found some online success after creating the YouTube channel Dankmus in 2016, a channel sampling and electronically remixing episodes of The Simpsons in a style known as Simpsonwave. In 2019, Nixon left his job as a music teacher to become a full-time gigging musician, but that never materialized due to the COVID-19 pandemic.

== YouTube career ==
=== DankPods ===
Nixon created the YouTube channel DankPods solely dedicated to content around iPods, for which he had gotten inspiration after his reselling side hustle. Nixon was surprised at how largely forgotten and cheap iPods had become, and wanted to bring them back into the public's attention, guided by nostalgia. He had used iPods heavily during his university studying days. The name is a combination of Dank and iPods and was a callback to his previous channel Dankmus. Nixon had been planning the channel for months prior to its first upload, perfecting its visuals, style, pacing and editing as well as writing around 70 videos. Nixon's grandfather had earlier passed away and left behind an inheritance which Nixon used to purchase a computer to make online content. The channel quickly grew in popularity after the video of him modding his iPod to have 2,000 GB of storage. This success led to Nixon quickly finding sponsorships, for which he used the money to purchase various sets of headphones to expand his channels' content. Despite this, Nixon hated the sponsorships and has since never had a paid sponsor in a video. He instead earned most of his income from Patreon, which he disabled in 2024 due to ongoing stress.

In an interview with the Verge, Nixon stated that he only had "manky MP3 players" in his childhood and that he's "nostalgic for them, but they’re pieces of junk." In 2021, Nixon began live streaming himself playing drums along to various meme music on Twitch. However, Twitch suspended his payments after the platform suffered a large data breach in October. Due to this, as well as the poor support service, Nixon left Twitch and instead moved to the paywalled independent content and streaming platform Floatplane in 2022. In May 2022, Nixon featured on the Australian news television program A Current Affair in a story about the iPod's discontinuation. In July 2023, Nixon announced he was going on hiatus for 3 weeks.

=== Garbage Time ===
Nixon began the YouTube channel Garbage Time in March 2021 as a secondary vlog-style miscellaneous channel about cars, drums, video games and his pet snake Frank. Around that time, he had begun renting a warehouse in an industrial zone to make content about cars and drums without disturbing his neighbours. From November 2022, the channel became exclusively dedicated to car content. Some of the more popular videos on the channel include filling a car engine with Nutella, and a series on repairing a FSM Niki nicknamed Tony. In July 2022, Nixon moved to another warehouse due to airplane noise from the nearby Parafield Airport. In early 2022, Nixon hired his longtime friend and auto mechanic James for the channel to repair and maintain the vehicles.

=== The Drum Thing ===
After Garbage Time became exclusively dedicated to car videos, Nixon created The Drum Thing exclusively for drum videos. The Drum Thing covers all the various different drum and cymbal related oddities from his collection, along with their history.

=== Other works ===
Name	Description	Link
Borkus Time	Nixon's video gaming channel, with a heavy focus on low quality games.	
Garbage Drum Stream	Nixon's drum stream VODs. Exclusive to Floatplane.	
Wades World	Nixon's personal vlog, mostly with videos of him trying snacks from around the world and reacting to music. Exclusive to Floatplane.	
Frank The Snake	Videos about Nixon's pet snake Frank, a recurring character in DankPods and other channels. Exclusive to Floatplane.	

== Personal life ==
Nixon has resided in Adelaide since 2011. He is a fan of Australian rules football and supporter of the Adelaide Crows AFL team. He is also a fan of racing sports such as Formula One, and a supporter of the Cleveland Browns in the NFL.

In 2015, while purchasing paint for a car, Nixon adopted a Murray Darling Carpet python from a reptile shop next door which he named Frank. At the end of every DankPods video, Frank is featured in a short humorous clip. Nixon has been featured on the podcast Cold Ones in 2022 and the YouTube channel Linus Tech Tips in 2023, where he attended that year's LTX Expo in Vancouver. Nixon has been heavily vocal and critical of enshittification in his videos, and has frequently repeated phrases such as "big companies always make the worst junk" and "modern parts suck". Nixon is non-religious.

== See also ==
- James Channel
