= Michal Dutkiewicz =

Australian illustrator and comic book artist

- Born: 1955 (age 70–71) Adelaide, South Australia, Australia
- Areas: Cartoonist, Penciller, Artist
- Notable works: "Angelwitch, Book One: Dragonscarpe"

Michal Dutkiewicz (born 1955) is an Australian illustrator and comic book artist based in Adelaide.

== Early life and education ==
Michal Dutkiewicz was born in 1955 in Adelaide, South Australia, the son of Polish-born artist Wladyslaw Dutkiewicz.

== Career ==
Dutkiewicz has worked on a variety of comic book titles, including Lost in Space (with actor and writer Bill Mumy), Wolverine: Doombringer, Batman Forever and Superman, as well as an illustrator on works such as Angelwitch, Book 1: Dragonscarpe and Angelwitch, Book 2: Triumvirate, with author Pat McNamara and conceptualist Gary Turner, for publisher Angel Phoenix Media and The Picture, a popular Australian men's magazine.

== Awards ==
- Stanley Award (Adventure /Illustrated Strip Artist), 1991.
- Stanley Award (Adventure /Illustrated Strip Artist), 1995.
- Stanley Award (Adventure /Illustrated Strip Artist), 1998.
- Royal South Australian Society Of Arts Award (Best Painting)

== Selected bibliography ==
- McNamara, Pat; Turner, Gary; Dutkiewicz, Michal (Illustrator) (2008). The Last Realm Book One: Dragonscarpe. Angel Phoenix Publishing. ISBN 978-982-9109-01-9.
- Dutkiewicz, Michal (2007). Girls! From Line to Color. SQP Inc. ISBN 978-0-86562-151-0.
- Mumy, Bill; Dutkiewicz, Michal (Illustrator); Severin, David (Illustrator) (2005). Lost In Space : Voyage To The Bottom Of The Soul. Bubblehead Publishing, Inc. ISBN 0-9765436-0-5.
- Dutkiewicz, Michal (2004). Girl Crazy: The Art of Michal Dutkiewicz. SQP Inc. ISBN 0-86562-097-0.
- Moench, Doug; Dutkiewicz, Michal (Illustrator) (1998). Stan Lee Presents Wolverine: Doombringer. Marvel Entertainment Group. ISBN 0-7851-0583-2.
- O'Neil, Dennis; Dutkiewicz, Michal (Illustrator) (1995). Batman Forever the Official Comic Adaptation of The Warner Bros. Motion Picture. DC Comics. ISBN 1-56389-199-9.
