= LearnToPlayMusic.com =

Music education company

LearnToPlayMusic.com is a music education publishing company founded in 1979 (as Koala Music Publications), in Adelaide, South Australia by guitarists Gary Turner (musician) and Brenton White.

The first book published by LearnToPlayMusic.com was Progressive Rhythm Guitar, followed by Progressive Lead Guitar and Progressive Guitar Method Book 1, the last of which has sold over six million copies. LearnToPlayMusic.com has published over 450 unique titles, and its products have been translated into nine languages. In 1982, the company expanded into the US and international markets, headquartering in Costa Mesa, California.

The company’s products cover music instruction for many different music genres, including; Blues, Rock, Classical, Country, Jazz, Heavy Metal, Folk, Gospel, Soul, Hip hop, Funk, Reggae, and R&B. Instruments taught include Guitar, Piano, Saxophone, Ukulele, Flute, Recorder, Banjo, Bass guitar, Mandolin, Drums, Electronic Keyboard, Singing, Trumpet, Harmonica, Clarinet, Violin, and Tin Whistle.

LearnToPlayMusic.com innovations include being the first music education publisher to add cassette tapes, CDs, and DVDs to their book products. In 1999, the company rebranded from Koala Music Publications to LearnToPlayMusic.com as part of a strategy to develop New Media and digital delivery methods and software. The company's products are distributed by Music Sales Group in Europe, Music Exchange in the UK, Hal Leonard Corporation in Australia, and Charles Dumont & Sons in the US.
