= James Goodfellow (cricketer) =

Australian cricketer

Personal information
- Born: 21 August 1850; Surrey, England
- Died: 22 July 1924 (aged 73); Malvern, South Australia
- Source: Cricinfo, 6 August 2020

James Goodfellow (21 August 1850 – 22 July 1924) was an Australian cricketer. He played in one first-class match for South Australia in 1880/81.

Goodfellow's brother George also played first-class cricket.

== See also ==
- List of South Australian representative cricketers
