= Delta (hip-hop artist) =

Hip hop artist

Delta (aka Ben Scudds) is an Australian hip hop artist, MC, producer, and dee-jay. He grew up in the southern suburbs of Adelaide, South Australia and cut his teeth as a battle MC. He has released three albums on the label Nuffsaid: The Lostralian (2006), The Second Story (2009) and Pyramid Schemes (2014). His albums were produced by British producer Mark B and include guest appearances from other rappers. His collaborators have included: MURS, Mojo, Prowla, Mr. Thing, Motions, Trem, Skinnyman, The Dap-Kings, Psycho Les, Milano and M-Phazes, Kool Herc and Lazy Grey. His debut EP Paperweight was released in 2002. He performs live with DJ Staen-1, who is a three-time DMC champion turntablist. As a club DJ, Delta specializes in hip hop, funk and soul.
