= Pearcey Foundation =

Australian organisation forcused on IT and telecommunications

The Pearcey Foundation is an Australian organisation dedicated to raising the profile of the Australian information technology and telecommunications industry.

== History ==
The Pearcey Foundation was formed in 1998. It is named after Trevor Pearcey (1919–1998), an Australian engineer who led the team that created CSIRAC, Australia's first and one of the world's earliest digital computers.

== Pearcy Awards ==
As part of its work, the Pearcey Foundation presents the Pearcey Awards each year. The Foundation awards the Pearcey Medal to the Australian who has made the most outstanding lifetime contribution to the Australian ICT industry, and each state committee makes an annual award to the ICT professional in that state who has made the most outstanding professional, innovative or business achievement in the field of ICT. Exceptional individuals are inducted into the Pearcey Hall of Fame.

=== Pearcey Medal ===
Winners of the Pearcey Medal include:

- 2023: David and Aidan Tudehope, founders of Macquarie Technology Group
- 2024: Svetha Venkatesh

=== Pearcey Hall of Fame ===
Inductees into the Pearcey Hall of Fame:

- 2023: David and Aidan Tudehope
- 2023: Jean Armstrong
- 2023: Richard White
- 2024: Svetha Venkatesh
- 2024: Andrew Dzurak
- 2024: Jan Kornweibel
