= Advanced planning and scheduling =

Manufacturing management process

Advanced planning and scheduling (APS, also known as advanced manufacturing) refers to a manufacturing management process by which raw materials and production capacity are optimally allocated to meet demand. APS is especially well-suited to environments where simpler planning methods cannot adequately address complex trade-offs between competing priorities. Production scheduling is intrinsically very difficult due to the (approximately) factorial dependence of the size of the solution space on the number of items/products to be manufactured.

== Difficulty of production planning ==
Traditional production planning and scheduling systems (such as manufacturing resource planning) use a stepwise procedure to allocate material and production capacity. This approach is simple but cumbersome, and does not readily adapt to changes in demand, resource capacity or material availability. Materials and capacity are planned separately, and many systems do not consider material or capacity constraints, leading to infeasible plans. However, attempts to change to the new system have not always been successful, which has called for the combination of management philosophy with manufacturing.

Unlike previous systems, APS simultaneously plans and schedules production based on available materials, labor and plant capacity.

APS has commonly been applied where one or more of the following conditions are present:

1. make to order (as distinct from make to stock) manufacturing
2. capital-intensive production processes, where plant capacity is constrained
3. products 'competing' for plant capacity: where many different products are produced in each facility
4. products that require a large number of components or manufacturing tasks
5. production necessitates frequent schedule changes which cannot be predicted before the event
