= Gary Turner (musician) =

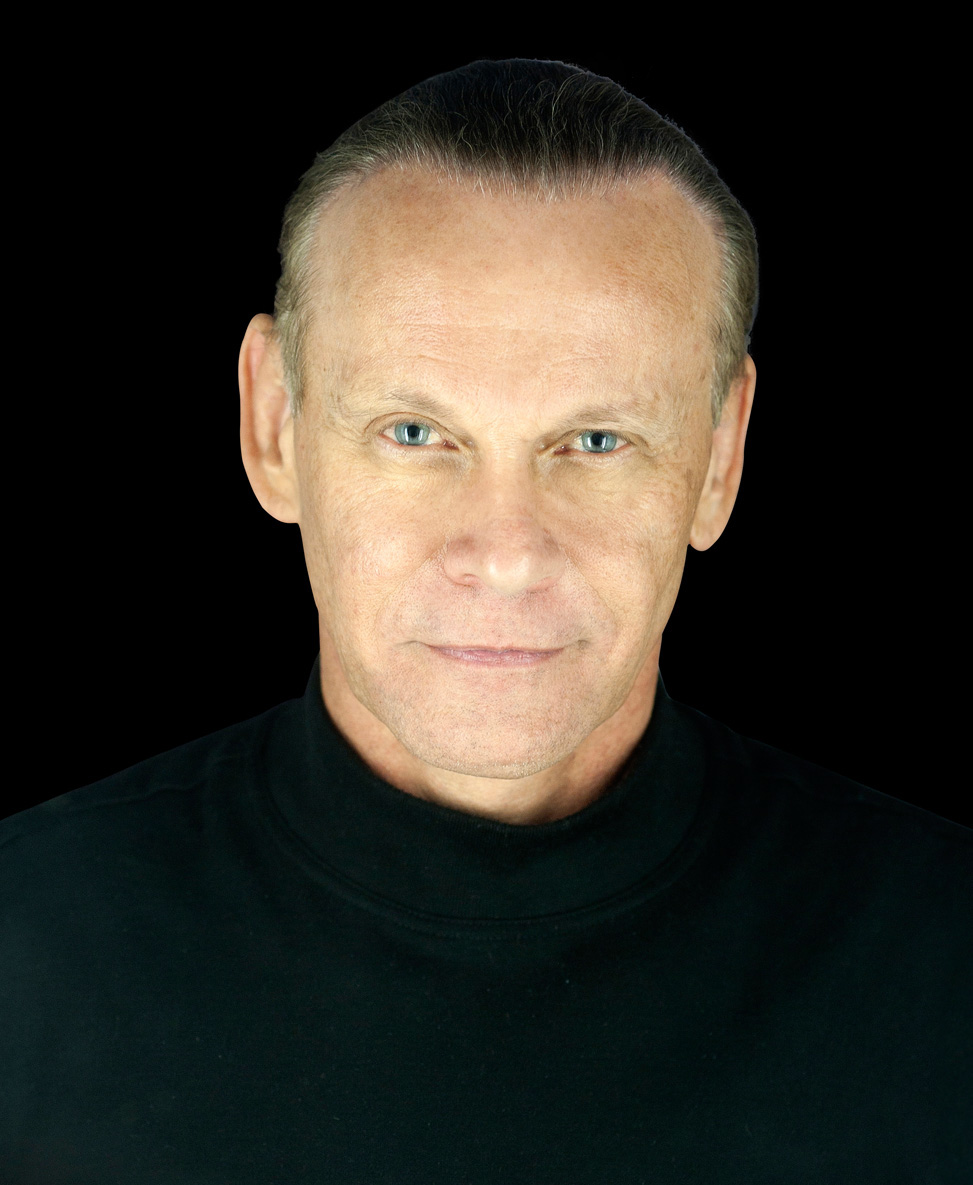
- Born: Gary Albert Turner; 22 June 1954 (age 72); Adelaide, Australia
- Occupations: Film & television producer; musician; writer; composer; publisher; record producer
- Years active: 1979–present
- Spouse: Kay Turner (married)
- Website: angelphoenix.com

Gary Albert Turner is a musician, writer, composer, publisher, record company owner, and film & television developer and producer. He was born in Adelaide, South Australia, and grew up in the working class suburb of Klemzig. He is the co-founder and owner of one of the world's leading music education publishers, Koala Music Publications / LearnToPlayMusic.com, and has written over ninety music education books, that have been translated into many languages, with total sales of over twenty million copies. He is the owner and co-founder of the film, television and new media production company, Angel Phoenix Media.

== Early years ==
Gary Turner was on born 22 June 1954 in Adelaide, Australia. Gary picked up his first guitar at age fifteen, and began studying classical guitar in 1974 under John de la Torre at Flinders Street College of Music. In 1975, he purchased his first electric guitar, an Ibanez Les Paul copy, then graduated to a Gibson Les Paul Custom, and began playing in rock bands around Adelaide and Australia.

== Career ==
In 1979, Gary and fellow Adelaide guitarist Brenton White founded Koala Music Publications (now LearnToPlayMusic.com ) and together they wrote and published their first music education book, Progressive Rhythm Guitar, then followed up with, Progressive Lead Guitar and then, Progressive Guitar Method Book One which has sold over six million copies. Since 1979, Gary has written and produced many music education books, CDs and DVDs for Koala Music Publications. In 1982, Gary and Brenton expanded Koala Music Publications into the US market, setting up in Costa Mesa, California. Gary traveled extensively throughout the US, and the world, promoting and building the Koala brand and business. When Brenton left Koala Music Publications in 1989, Gary became sole owner of the company. In 1999, Gary rebranded Koala Music Publications to LearnToPlayMusic.com as part of his strategy to expand the company into new media products and software.

From 1990 until 2002, Gary founded and managed the indie music label, Krell Records, and produced and released albums by notable Australian indie bands Testeagles, Honeyfix and The Violets. He also founded the music recording studio, Krell Studios, which was most notably used by Ben Folds to record tracks for his first solo album, Rockin' the Suburbs, as well as The Mark of Cain, Embryonic Soul, and the Australian World Music trio, Thinking Aloud's album, Shanti. The name Krell was chosen by Gary as a tribute to the classic 1956 science fiction film Forbidden Planet, as illustrated by the company logo created for Krell Records by Australian artist, Glenn Lumsden.

In 1992, Gary founded Australian Compact Discs, one of the first two Compact Disc production facilities in Australia, and managed the company until he sold the business in 1997.

In 2004, Gary founded the film, television, book and new media development and production studio, Angel Phoenix Media. Working as manager, producer and conceptualist at Angel Phoenix Media, Gary created and co-developed the Angelwitch illustrated fantasy novel series with writer, Pat McNamara, and illustrator Michal Dutkiewicz, and the science fiction novels, The Pandora Sequence, and Venus IA, with writer Alex James. Gary is developing Angelwitch, Venus IA and The Pandora Sequence and a number of other properties he has created for television.
