= George Goodfellow (cricketer) =

Australian cricketer

Personal information
- Full name: George Aylett Goodfellow
- Born: 21 March 1858; Adelaide, South Australia, Australia
- Died: 5 July 1892 (aged 34); Adelaide, South Australia, Australia
- Batting: Unknown
- Bowling: Right-arm (unknown style)
- Relatives: James Goodfellow (brother)

Career statistics
Competition	First-class
Matches	1
Runs scored	4
Batting average	2.00
100s/50s	–/–
Top score	4
Balls bowled	88
Wickets	1
Bowling average	31.00
5 wickets in innings	–
10 wickets in match	–
Best bowling	1/24
Catches/stumpings	–/–
- Source: Cricinfo, 24 June 2019

George Aylett Goodfellow (21 March 1858 – 5 July 1892) was an Australian first-class cricketer.

Goodfellow was born at Adelaide in March 1858. He played a minor match for South Australia against the Australians at Adelaide in December 1877, before travelling to England. While in England he made a single appearance in first-class cricket for a London United Eleven against the United North of England Eleven at Birmingham in 1879. Batting twice in the match, he was dismissed in the London United Eleven first-innings by Billy Bates for 4 runs, while in their second-innings he was dismissed by the same bowler without scoring. After bowling nine overs in the United North of England Eleven, which although wicketless were economical with Goodfellow conceding just 7 run, he went onto take a single wicket in their second-innings when he dismissed George Ulyett to finish with figures of 1 for 24 from thirteen overs. He died at Adelaide in July 1892. His brother, James, was also a first-class cricketer.
