= Andreas Wallraff =

German physicist

- Education: Imperial College London; RWTH Aachen University; Forschungszentrum Jülich
- Known for: Work on superconducting quantum computing. Work with hybrid quantum systems involving Rydberg atoms and semiconductor quantum dots.
- Awards: Nicholas Kurti Science Prize for Europe (2006) ETH Zurich Rössler Prize (2011)
- Scientific career
- Fields: Quantum information science, Superconducting quantum computing
- Workplaces: Swiss Federal Institute of Technology in Zurich
- Theses: Fluxon Dynamics and Radiation Emission in Twofold Long Josephson Junction Stacks (1997); Fluxon Dynamics in Annular Josephson Junctions: From Relativistic Strings to Quantum Particles (2000)
- Doctoral advisor: Alexey V. Ustinov
- Website: https://www.qudev.ethz.ch/

Andreas Wallraff is a German physicist who conducts research in quantum information processing and quantum optics. He has taught as a professor at ETH Zurich in Zurich, Switzerland since 2006. He worked as a research scientist with Robert J. Schoelkopf at Yale University from 2002 to 2005, during which time he performed experiments in which the coherent interaction of a single photon with a single quantum electronic circuit was observed for the first time. His current work at ETH Zurich focuses on hybrid quantum systems combining superconducting electronic circuits with semiconductor quantum dots and individual Rydberg atoms as well as quantum error correction with superconducting qubits.

He has contributed primarily to the field of quantum information science, particularly in superconducting quantum computing and hybrid quantum systems.

== Education and earlier work ==
Andreas Wallraff obtained his undergraduate degrees in physics from Imperial College London and RWTH Aachen University and conducted research on soliton dynamics in stacked Josephson tunnel junctions for his master's degree at the Forschungszentrum Jülich and RWTH Aachen, which he earned in 1997. During his doctoral research on soliton and vortex dynamics in superconductors at the University of Erlangen-Nuremberg, he observed for the first time the tunneling and energy level quantization of an individual quantum vortex for which he obtained a PhD degree in physics in 2000.

Following his doctoral research, Wallraff continued to work as a research scientist and later as an assistant professor at the University of Erlangen-Nuremberg. In 2002, he left Europe to work as a postdoctoral researcher with Robert J. Schoelkopf within the Department of Applied Physics at Yale University in New Haven, Connecticut. During this time, he was an author on papers regarding the coupling of superconducting qubits via a cavity bus and the coherent interaction of a single photon to a Cooper-pair box, among others. In 2004 he was appointed as an associate research scientist in the Department of Applied Physics at Yale and in June 2005 he was elected as a tenure-track assistant professor at ETH Zurich. Following the professorship appointment, he departed from Yale and started the Quantum Device Lab at ETH Zurich in January 2006. In 2011, he was chosen from among 380 ETH Zurich professors to be awarded the Max Rössler Prize for his research activities. In 2012, he worked as a visiting professor at the Kastler-Brossel Laboratory within the École Normale Supérieure in Paris, France.

== Research topics ==
Wallraff has in recent years been studying a variety of topics related to quantum information science. Among them include interactions between distant artificial atoms, quantum many-body systems, digital quantum simulation, quantum nonlocality, the implementation of the Toffoli gate in quantum computation, deterministic quantum teleportation, and the Hong-Ou-Mandel effect.

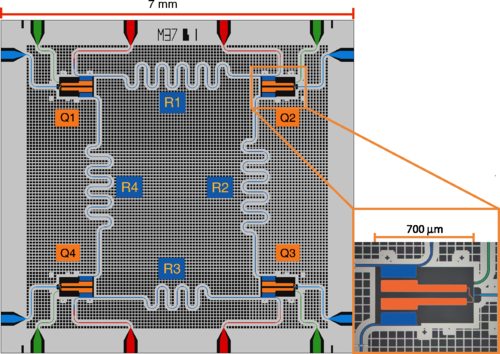
A chip with four superconducting transmon qubits made by Andreas Wallraff and colleagues. Two of the qubits were used in the experiment which led to the publication of "Digital Quantum Simulation of Spin Models with Circuit Quantum Electrodynamics" in Physical Review X in June 2015.

In general, his research is primarily focused on investigating circuit QED (cQED) systems and their applications in superconducting quantum computing. These include implementing quantum gates, identifying and eliminating sources of quantum decoherence to extend qubit lifetimes, and creating solid-state architectures in which quantum error correction is possible. In addition, he conducts research into "hybrid quantum systems"; cQED systems interacting with Rydberg atoms and semiconductor quantum dots to combine "the long coherence times available in microscopic quantum systems with the strong interactions and integration available in solid state systems... [to allow] for strong interactions with control fields and thus fast manipulation of the quantum state of a system." His research has been honoured with multiple awards, such as the ETH Zurich's Rössler-Prize in 2013 and the Helmholtz International Fellow Award in 2020.

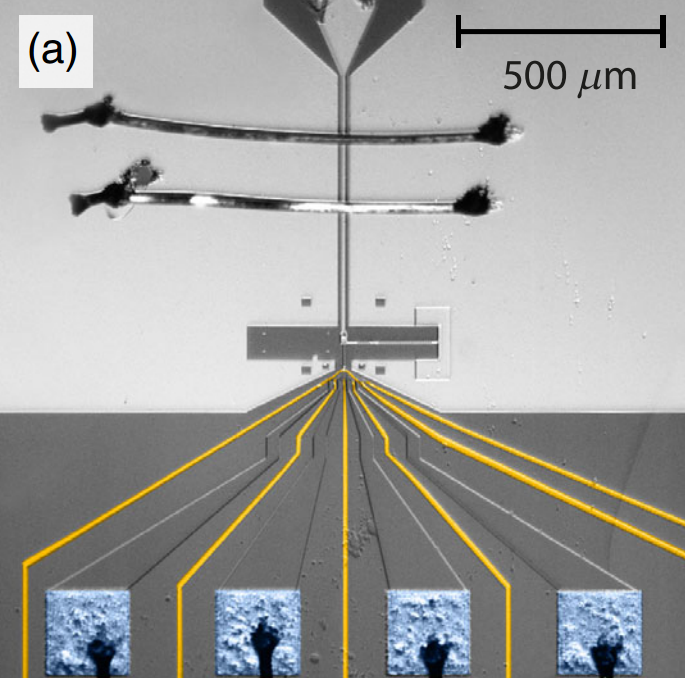
"A gate-defined GaAs double quantum dot (DQD) and a frequency-tunable high impedance resonator realized using an array of superconducting quantum interference devices... [This] false-color optical micrograph of a representative device [indicates] the substrate (dark gray), the superconducting structures (light gray), the gold top gates (yellow) forming the DQD, and its source and drain leads and contacts (blue)."

== Positions and speaking engagements ==
Since January 2006, Wallraff has held a professorship position at ETH Zurich where he is the head of the Quantum Device Lab within the Laboratory for Solid State Physics. He has been awarded several grants, including two from the European Research Council (one in 2009 for hybrid cavity quantum electrodynamics and one in 2013 for superconducting quantum networks) and holds positions as the President of the Strategy Commission for the Department of Physics and Deputy Head of the Laboratory for Solid State Physics at ETH Zurich. He is also a member of the Scientific Committee for the Swiss National Science Foundation National Center of Competence in Research (NCCR) in Quantum Science and Technology (QSIT), a member of the Global Future Council for the Future of Computing at the World Economic Forum, and an Associate Fellow of the Canadian Institute for Advanced Research.

Wallraff has been an invited speaker at several talks and conferences, including at the inaugural celebration for the Center for Quantum Coherence Science at the University of California, Berkeley, The Optical Society "Quantum Information and Measurement - Quantum Technologies" meeting at the Pierre and Marie Curie University, the IWQD 2017 workshop at the National Institute of Informatics, and the 635th WE Heraeus Seminar in 2017. In 2016 he spoke at the Institute of Physics Silicon Quantum Information Processing meeting at Murray Edwards College, Cambridge, the University of Science and Technology of China, and the SCALEQIT International Conference at the Delft University of Technology.

In previous years he also spoke at the University of Oxford, the Max Planck Institute for the Science of Light, the Institute for Theoretical Atomic Molecular and Optical Physics (ITAMP) 2015 workshop at Harvard University, and the Kavli Institute for Theoretical Physics at the University of California, Santa Barbara.
