= Leonid Glazman =

Ukrainian-American theoretical condensed matter physicist

Leonid I. Glazman
- Citizenship: United States
- Education: Kharkov State University (BS); Institute for Low Temperature Physics and Engineering, Ukrainian SSR Academy of Sciences (PhD, 1982)
- Known for: Kondo effect in quantum dots Nonlinear Luttinger liquid Coulomb blockade Superconducting qubits (fluxonium)
- Awards: Member, National Academy of Sciences (2025); Member, American Academy of Arts and Sciences (2023); Humboldt Research Award (2002); Fellow, American Physical Society (1997)
- Scientific career
- Fields: Condensed matter physics Mesoscopic physics Quantum information
- Workplaces: USSR Academy of Sciences; University of Minnesota; Yale University

Leonid Glazman is a Ukrainian-American theoretical physicist and the Donner Professor of Physics and Professor of Applied Physics at Yale University. He has worked in condensed matter physics, particularly in the areas of mesoscopic physics, quantum dots, one-dimensional quantum systems, and superconducting qubits. He is a member of the National Academy of Sciences, the American Academy of Arts and Sciences, and the Yale Quantum Institute.

== Education and early career ==
Glazman received his undergraduate degree from Kharkov State University in Ukraine. He earned his PhD in physics in 1982 from the Institute for Low Temperature Physics and Engineering of the Ukrainian SSR Academy of Sciences. He began his research career at the USSR Academy of Sciences in Moscow.

== Career ==
In 1990, Glazman joined the faculty of the University of Minnesota, where he was one of the three founding members of the condensed matter group at the William I. Fine Theoretical Physics Institute (FTPI). He held the McKnight Presidential Chair of Theoretical Condensed Matter Physics and later served as director of FTPI.

He joined Yale University in 2007 as a professor of physics and applied physics, and was designated the Donner Professor of Physics in 2015. He is a member of the Yale Quantum Institute.

== Research ==
Glazman is a condensed matter theorist whose research focuses on the quantum physics of interacting systems in low-dimensional and mesoscopic structures. His work spans mesoscopic physics, superconductivity, and the physics of cold atoms. He actively collaborates with experimental groups at Yale in the field of quantum information and with quantum materials groups outside the university.

=== Kondo effect in quantum dots ===
In 1988, Glazman and M. E. Raikh predicted that the Kondo effect—a many-body phenomenon originally observed in metals containing magnetic impurities—would arise in electron transport through a quantum dot. This prediction, made independently and simultaneously by Tai-Kai Ng and Patrick A. Lee, was experimentally confirmed a decade later by groups at MIT and the Weizmann Institute, and at Delft University of Technology.

=== Nonlinear Luttinger liquid ===
Glazman and collaborators introduced the concept of the nonlinear Luttinger liquid, extending the standard Luttinger liquid paradigm for one-dimensional quantum systems beyond the linear approximation of the electron dispersion relation. This framework built new connections between different areas of quantum many-body theory, from phenomenology to mathematical physics.

=== Coulomb blockade ===
Glazman has made contributions to the theory of the Coulomb blockade in mesoscopic systems, including quantum effects in single-electron tunneling and charge quantization.

=== Superconducting qubits ===
Glazman's contributions to the quantum theory of Coulomb blockade and charge parity effects in superconducting Coulomb islands are relevant to multiple types of superconducting qubits, including transmons and prospective topological qubits based on semiconductor-superconductor heterostructures. He was among the co-inventors of the fluxonium qubit.

== Awards and honors ==
- Member, National Academy of Sciences (2025)
- Member, American Academy of Arts and Sciences (2023)
- Senior Fellow, Institute for Theoretical Studies, ETH Zurich (2017)
- Donner Professor of Physics, Yale University (2015)
- Schrödinger Visiting Professor, Pauli Center, ETH Zurich (2015)
- Leverhulme Trust Visiting Professorship (2012)
- Chair of Excellence, Nanosciences Foundation, Grenoble (2008–2011)
- Humboldt Research Award for Senior US Scientists (2002)
- NSF Creativity Award (2000)
- McKnight Presidential Chair of Theoretical Condensed Matter Physics, University of Minnesota (2000)
- Fellow, American Physical Society (1997)

== Selected publications ==
- Glazman, L. I.; Raikh, M. E. (1988). "Resonant Kondo transparency of a barrier with quasilocal impurity states". JETP Letters. 47: 452–455.
- Fisher, M. P. A.; Glazman, L. I. (1997). "Transport in one-dimensional Luttinger liquid". NATO ASI Series. 345: 331. arXiv:cond-mat/9610037.
- Aleiner, I. L.; Brouwer, P. W.; Glazman, L. I. (2002). "Quantum effects in Coulomb blockade". Physics Reports. 358 (5–6): 309–440. arXiv:cond-mat/0103008.
- Manucharyan, V. E.; Koch, J.; Glazman, L. I.; Devoret, M. H. (2009). "Fluxonium: Single Cooper-Pair Circuit Free of Charge Offsets". Science. 326: 113–116.
- Deshpande, V. V.; Bockrath, M.; Glazman, L. I.; Yacoby, A. (2010). "Electron liquids and solids in one dimension". Nature. 464: 209–216.
- Imambekov, A.; Schmidt, T. L.; Glazman, L. I. (2012). "One-dimensional quantum liquids: Beyond the Luttinger liquid paradigm". Reviews of Modern Physics. 84: 1253–1306. arXiv:1110.1374.
