= Fluxonium =

Superconducting qubit architecture

In quantum computing, the fluxonium is a type of superconducting qubit architecture used for gate-based quantum computation that is insensitive to offset charge noise. It is constructed from a Josephson junction, a capacitor, and a “superinductor” (a type of inductor) arranged in a loop.

The fluxonium was first proposed as a candidate for a qubit by an experimental group at Yale University led by Michel Devoret in 2009. It is a flux-like qubit, meaning that its energy levels correspond to integer numbers of magnetic flux/phase states. This architecture has long coherence times and high anharmonicity (or nonlinearity), both of which are important for successful qubit architectures. By changing the relative values of the different circuit components, fluxoniums can be engineered to have other properties, such as resistance to noise. However, the design requires complex fabrication methods, and is therefore difficult to scale.

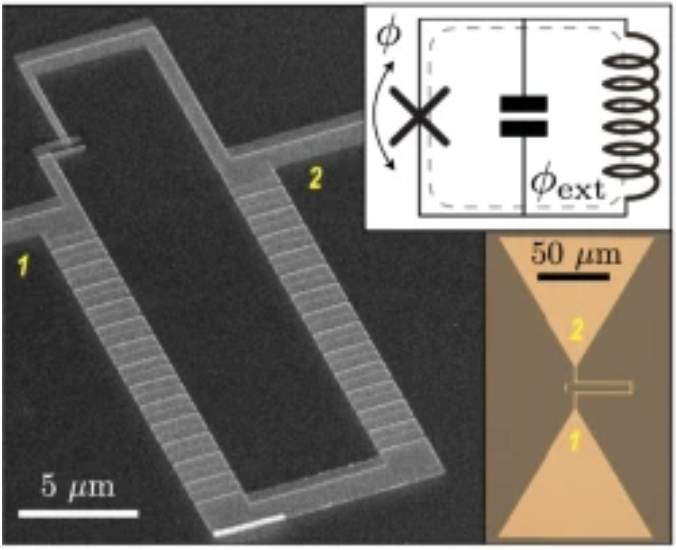
Fluxonium superconducting loop consisting of a collection of larger area Josephson junctions and one smaller area Josephson junction, as shown by an electron microscope. Top right image: fluxonium circuit components. Bottom right: a smaller area Josephson junction.

The fluxonium architecture has achieved among the strongest coherence for any solid-state superconducting qubit, with millisecond-level coherence times. Fluxoniums are a candidate for a qubit in a quantum processor, with some companies like D-Wave, Atlantic Quantum, and Qilimanjaro focused specifically on developing fluxonium-based quantum computing hardware.

== Background ==
The first successful superconducting qubits were charge qubits, also known as Cooper boxes. These designs consisted of a small superconducting island connected to a reservoir of Cooper pairs by a Josephson junction. They suffered from being extremely sensitive to charge noise, which limited their coherence times. To combat this problem, the transmon architecture was later introduced, which included a shunting capacitor in a loop with the initial charge qubit design. In this regime, $E_J \gg E_C$, which flattened the energy bands so that charge noise was exponentially suppressed. However, the transmon suffers from low anharmonicity, Purcell decay, and leakage.

The fluxonium device was developed to mitigate these challenges by incorporating a shunting inductor and tuning the circuit to a specific flux bias point. This architecture allows the device to be insensitive to "offset" charge noise, a type of noise which is caused by random electric field fluctuations, and which shift the resonant frequency of the system. To be insensitive to charge noise, the fluxonium uses a "superinductor" as its shunting element, which is an array of several Josephson junctions and which exploits a superconductor's kinetic inductance. This effectively grounds the charge degree of freedom. As a result, fluxonium qubits are more resistant to information loss and noise than traditional architectures. However, the large number of array junctions introduces significantly more complexity to the circuit compared to flux qubits, posing a challenge to fluxoniums at scale.

== Operation ==
The fluxonium operates in the flux regime rather than the charge regime. This means it is a kind of flux qubit, the energy levels correspond to different integer numbers of magnetic flux quanta (rather than electric charge). The fluxonium is inherently flux-tunable, meaning that by applying magnetic flux, it is possible to continuously modulate the system's energy levels (resonant frequencies).

=== Hamiltonian ===
In a fluxonium, the junction and inductance form a superconducting loop that can then be biased by an external magnetic flux. The Hamiltonian for this system is:

$$\hat{H}
= 4 E_C \hat{N}^2
+ \frac{1}{2} E_L \hat{\varphi}^2
- E_J \cos\!\left(\hat{\varphi} - 2\pi \frac{\Phi_{\mathrm{ext}}}{\Phi_0}\right)$$

where $E_J$ is the Josephson energy; $E_C$is the charging energy of the total capacitance; $E_L$ is the superinductor's inductive energy; $\hat{N}$ is the Cooper-pair number operator and $\hat{\varphi}$ is the superconducting phase across the Josephson junction.

The large inductive energy term, $\frac{1}{2} E_L \hat{\varphi}^2$, comes from the superinductor. The Josephson term includes a flux offset, $\Phi_{\mathrm{ext}}$, demonstrating that the properties of the fluxonium are strongly flux-dependent. Tuning the flux changes the shape of the potential and the sensitivity to flux noise, so choosing a good operating point is necessary for the fluxonium.

The most common operating point is the half-flux point ${\Phi_{\mathrm{ext}}} = {\Phi_0}/2$ because it is insensitive to flux noise at first order. The wavefunctions at this bias point are symmetric double wells. At exactly this point, there is maximal coherence, and protection from flux noise, since it is since it is first-order insensitive to it. At this external bias point, the fluxonium has a resonant frequency between 100 MHz and 1 GHz, and can have a relaxation time of over 1 ms.

At this operating point, the dispersive shift $\chi$ can be very small, so one strategy is to bias slightly off of ${\Phi_0}/2$ for readout.

=== Single-qubit gates ===
Single-qubit gates using fluxoniums have a single-qubit fidelity of up to 99.998 percent. This is the highest fidelity for any superconducting qubit.

Counter-rotating errors, caused by strong, linearly polarized drives, traditionally pose a problem to high-fidelity single-qubit fluxonium gates. Applying a pulse at the correct times can make counter-rotating errors consistent from pulse-to-pulse, and suppress this source of error.

==== Operating frequency ====
Dielectric noise in superconducting qubits grows with frequency. The industry-standard transmon qubit architecture has an operating frequency of 4–5 GHz. However fluxoniums have an operating frequency of 0.1–1 GHz. Operating at these lower frequencies reduces the dielectric noise. However, operating at lower frequencies usually means slower gate times.

=== Two-qubit gates ===
Two-qubit gates are operations that act on pairs of qubits. Demonstrating high-fidelity two-qubit gates are an important step towards a viable quantum processor. Implementing them is an ongoing research topic in superconducting quantum computing.

==== Capactive coupling ====
Two-qubit gates between superconducting qubits generally rely on capacitive coupling. However, direct capacitive coupling between fluxoniums results in strong undesired entangling rates (ZZ error) and increased gate errors.

==== Fluxonium-transmon-fluxonium (FTF) architecture ====
An alternative architecture for fluxonium-fluxonium two-qubit gates is mediated by transmon couplers. This is known as FTF, for fluxonium-transmon-fluxonium. FTF addresses the problems of directly coupling fluxoniums by using non-computational states to enabling stronger couplings, while simultaneously suppressing the static controlled-phase entangling rate (ZZ).

== See also ==
- Superconducting quantum computing
- Circuit quantum electrodynamics
