= Andrew Houck =

American quantum scientist

Andrew A. Houck (born June 20, 1979) is an American physicist, quantum information scientist, and professor of electrical and computer engineering at Princeton University. He is dean of Princeton's School of Engineering and Applied Science. He was formerly director of the Co-Design Center for Quantum Advantage, a national research center funded by the U.S. Department of Energy Office of Science, and co-director of the Princeton Quantum Initiative. His research focuses on superconducting electronic circuits to process and store information for quantum computing and to simulate and study many-body physics. He is a pioneer of circuit QED architecture and superconducting qubits.

== Early life and education ==
Andrew Houck grew up in Colts Neck, New Jersey, the son of David and Dennie Houck. He studied electrical engineering at Princeton, where he was valedictorian of the Class of 2000. He received a Ph.D. from Harvard University in 2005.

== Research ==
As a postdoctoral researcher at Yale University, in Robert Schoelkopf's lab, Houck was part of the team that originally developed the transmon — a superconducting qubit that is insensitive to charge noise — now the basic unit of hardware for many of today's most mature quantum technologies. He later redesigned the transmon using tantalum, leading to a major improvement in this class of devices.

In 2019, Houck led a group that developed a microchip to simulate particle interactions in a hyperbolic plane, useful in investigating quantum phenomena.

He has called quantum computing an "enabling technology" to solve problems in national security, health and climate change.
