= Superconducting tunnel junction =

Electronic device

The superconducting tunnel junction (STJ) – also known as a superconductor–insulator–superconductor tunnel junction (SIS) – is an electronic device consisting of two superconductors separated by a very thin layer of insulating material. Current passes through the junction via the process of quantum tunneling. The STJ is a type of Josephson junction, though not all the properties of the STJ are described by the Josephson effect.

These devices have a wide range of applications, including high-sensitivity detectors of electromagnetic radiation, magnetometers, high speed digital circuit elements, and quantum computing circuits.

== Quantum tunneling ==
Illustration of a thin-film superconducting tunnel junction (STJ). The superconducting material is light blue, the insulating tunnel barrier is black, and the substrate is green.

Energy diagram of a superconducting tunnel junction. The vertical axis is energy, and the horizontal axis shows the density of states. Cooper pairs exist at the Fermi energy, indicated by the dashed lines. A bias voltage V is applied across the junction, shifting the Fermi energies of the two superconductors relative to each other by an energy eV, where e is the electron charge. Quasiparticle states exist for energies greater than Δ from the Fermi energy, where Δ is the superconducting energy gap. Green and blue indicate empty and filled quasiparticle states, respectively, at zero temperature.

Sketch of the current–voltage (I–V) curve of a superconducting tunnel junction. The Cooper pair tunneling current is seen at V = 0, while the quasiparticle tunneling current is seen for V > 2Δ/e and V < -2Δ/e.

All currents flowing through the STJ pass through the insulating layer via the process of quantum tunneling. There are two components to the tunneling current. The first is from the tunneling of Cooper pairs. This supercurrent is described by the ac and dc Josephson relations, first predicted by Brian David Josephson in 1962. For this prediction, Josephson received the Nobel Prize in Physics in 1973. The second is the quasiparticle current, which, in the limit of zero temperature, arises when the energy from the bias voltage $eV$ exceeds twice the value of the superconducting energy gap Δ (in case the gaps in the base electrode and the counterelectrode aren't equal, the onset of current occurs at Δ_{1} + Δ_{2}.) At finite temperature, a small quasiparticle tunneling current – called the subgap current – is present even for voltages less than twice the energy gap due to thermal exiation of quasiparticles above the gap.

If the STJ is irradiated with photons of frequency $f$, the dc current-voltage curve will exhibit both Shapiro steps and steps due to photon-assisted tunneling. Shapiro steps arise from the response of the supercurrent and occur at voltages equal to $nhf/(2e)$, where $h$ is the Planck constant, $e$ is the electron charge, and $n$ is an integer. Photon-assisted tunneling arises from the response of the quasiparticles and gives rise to steps displaced in voltage by $nhf/e$ relative to the gap voltage.

== Device fabrication ==
Early work used lead-lead oxide-lead (Pb-PbO-Pb) tunnel junctions; for example, the experimental discovery of the Josephson effect was made on such junctions. Lead has a superconducting critical temperature of 7.2 K, and so a lead-oxide-lead junction can operate in liquid helium at 4.2K. However, a lead junction is unstable; it fails after a few, often only one, thermal cycles between the operation temperature of 4.2 K and room temperature. To improve junction stability, researchers at IBM added small amounts of indium (In) and gold (Au) to lead, creating a tunnel junction that was more stable than the one made of pure lead, but still far from the desired performance. Additionally, processing steps tolerated by such soft junctions are limited. As a result of all these problems, lead and lead-alloy soft junctions are no longer used to make STJs. Instead, since the early to mid-1980s, superconducting electronics have used refractory (hard-metal-based) tunnel junctions based on niobium.

The process of device fabrication varies depending on the desired properties. In most cases, fabrication aims to create tunnel junctions that will be superconducting in a helium bath at 4.2 K. In that case, ever since 1983, everyone has universally used a technology developed in the early 1980s at AT&T Bell Labs. This technology is described in more detail in the sections "SIS tunnel junctions" and "Fabrication" of the article "Josephson Junctions". Here, we provide a shortened version of that description.

Device fabrication starts with the formation of a uniform trilayer structure of Nb/Al-oxide/Nb, which covers the entire substrate, typically a silicon wafer, sometimes oxidized. All metal layers are typically deposited by sputtering. After the formation of the Nb/Al base structure (where Nb is a 100-150 nm metal film covered with a very thin (typically 5 nm) layer of aluminum), it is exposed for a few minutes to pure oxygen at a reduced (below atmospheric) pressure, all without opening the deposition chamber. This base (Nb/Al-oxide) structure is then covered by a second niobium electrode (called the counter-electrode) of comparable thickness to the first, all within the same system. Care must be taken to prevent the structure from overheating; often, water cooling is used to lower the temperature during deposition. The resulting S'IS sandwich uniformly covers the entire silicon wafer. Here, S' denotes the bottom electrode, which consists of an Nb/Al double layer; "I" denotes thin (typically around 1 nm) tunneling aluminum oxide; and S denotes the second Nb electrode. The role of Al is to replace troublesome niobium oxide with the proven, reliable aluminum tunneling oxide, Al_{2}O_{3}. This substitution works so well because, as was shown at Bell Labs in the early 1980s, even extremely thin aluminum overlayers tend to completely cover, "wet" the niobium surface. The small thickness of low-Tc aluminum enables its superconductivity, induced by the relatively high-Tc niobium via the well-known proximity effect

After the formation of the trilayer structure, it can be processed to form superconducting circuits and Josephson junctions (JJs). This process can vary, but the initial process developed in the early 1980s at AT&T Bell Labs by Gurvitch and co-workers still underpins all existing techniques. Over the years, the initial trilayer process has been refined into a sophisticated multilayer process on par with silicon integrated circuit technology. And yet the main steps in Nb/Al-oxide/Nb junction preparation are essentially identical to the steps from over forty years ago—an uncommon technological longevity that speaks to the simplicity and naturalness of the original Nb/Al-oxide/Nb trilayer process.

An explanatory note is in order: why couldn't Nb-oxide-Nb structures be used? This structure cannot be used because Nb forms a poor, mixed, unstable tunneling oxide, and depositing a second Nb electrode tends to destroy it and short-circuit the junction. Another reason is the high dielectric constant of Nb_{2}O_{5,} so that even if one succeeded in making Nb-oxide-Nb junctions, they would be, for that reason alone, inferior to Nb/Al-oxide/Nb junctions in digital applications.

The benefits obtained in the trilayer whole-wafer process are numerous. The resulting Josephson junctions are uniform, reproducible, and very reliable. In particular, they are completely immune to repeated thermal cycling between 4.2 K and room temperature. The quality of junction characteristics approaches that of the theoretical ideal (see the figure above, which depicts an idealized SIS Josephson junction characteristic). The dielectric constant of the tunneling dielectric layer—which, as was confirmed in detailed studies, is composed of aluminum oxide Al_{2}O_{3} -- is low, which is beneficial in digital applications.

The same process was used for some time in Quantum Computing, where scientists employed Josephson junctions and SQUIDs (loops with two Josephson junctions) to create qubits. However, since the operating temperature of quantum circuits is only a few millikelvins, superconducting niobium (Tc = 9.2 K) is no longer required; pure aluminum, which superconducts below 1.2 K, is sufficient. Although earlier quantum circuits were fabricated with trilayer technology, in the last decade, quantum scientists have been fabricating superconducting qubits using simpler Al-oxide-Al structures. However, in all other applications, Nb/Al-oxide/Nb structures are ubiquitous.

== Applications ==
=== Radio astronomy ===
STJs are the most sensitive heterodyne receivers in the 100 GHz to 1000 GHz frequency range, and hence are used for radio astronomy at these frequencies. In this application, the STJ is dc biased at a voltage just below the gap voltage ($|V| = 2\Delta /e$). A high-frequency signal from an astronomical object of interest is focused onto the STJ, along with a local oscillator source. Photons absorbed by the STJ allow quasiparticles to tunnel via the process of photon-assisted tunneling. This photon-assisted tunneling modifies the current-voltage curve, introducing a nonlinearity that generates an output at the difference frequency between the astronomical signal and the local oscillator. This output is a frequency down-converted version of the astronomical signal. These receivers are so sensitive that an accurate description of the device performance must take into account the effects of quantum noise.

=== Single-photon detection ===
In addition to heterodyne detection, STJs can also be used as direct detectors. In this application, the STJ is biased with a dc voltage less than the gap voltage. A photon absorbed in the superconductor breaks Cooper pairs and creates quasiparticles. The quasiparticles tunnel across the junction in the direction of the applied voltage, and the resulting tunneling current is proportional to the photon energy. STJ devices have been employed as single-photon detectors for photon frequencies ranging from X-rays to the infrared.

=== SQUIDs ===
The superconducting quantum interference device, or SQUID, is based on a superconducting loop containing Josephson junctions. SQUIDs are the world's most sensitive magnetometers, capable of detecting magnetic field changes that correspond to a fraction of a magnetic flux quantum.

=== Quantum computing ===
Superconducting quantum computing utilizes STJ-based circuits, including charge qubits, flux qubits, and phase qubits.

=== RSFQ ===
The STJ is the primary active element for rapid single flux quanta fast logic circuits.

=== Josephson voltage standard ===
When a high-frequency current is applied to a Josephson junction, the ac Josephson current will synchronize with the applied frequency, giving rise to regions of constant voltage in the I–V curve of the device (Shapiro steps). For the purpose of voltage standards, these steps occur at the voltages equal to $nf/K_\text{J}$ where $n$ is an integer, $f$ is the applied frequency and the constant $K_\text{J}$ = 483597.8484...×10^{9} Hz⋅V^{−1} is the Josephson constant equal to $2e/h$. These steps provide an exact conversion from frequency to voltage. Because frequency can be measured with very high precision, this effect is used as the basis of the Josephson voltage standard, which implements the SI definition of the volt.

=== Josephson diode ===
If the STJ exhibits asymmetric Josephson tunneling, the junction can become a Josephson diode

== See also ==
- Superconductivity
- Josephson effect
- Macroscopic quantum phenomena
- Quantum tunneling
- Superconducting quantum interference device (SQUID)
- Superconducting quantum computing
- Rapid single flux quantum (RSFQ)
- Cryogenic particle detectors
