= Helmholtz International Fellow Award =

International award

The Helmholtz International Fellow Award is an award named after Hermann von Helmholtz and awarded to "excellent researchers and science managers from abroad".

Hermann von Helmhotz was a German physicist and physician who made significant contributions to several scientific fields, particularly hydrodynamic stability.

Recipients of the award is rewarded with a EUR 20,000. The recipients are granted approval to conduct researches using the Helmholtz facilities.

== History ==
The award was first awarded in 2012 by the Helmholtz Association, the largest scientific association in Germany.

Annually, the award is conferred on no more than 10 scientists. As of 2017, only 63 scientists have been awarded. It is funded through the Helmholtz President’s Initiative and Networking Fund. The awardees are selected by the Helmholtz President’s Council following a nomination by the Helmholtz centers.

== Notable recipients ==
- Chen Hesheng
- Andreas Wallraff
- Aimy Bazylak
- Margaret A. Palmer
