= Chen Hesheng =

Chinese physician and politician

Chen Hesheng is a Chinese researcher, nuclear physicist, particle physicist, and fellow of the Chinese Academy of Sciences. He was the Director of the Institute of High Energy Physics and the Vice President of the Chinese Physical Society.

== Education and career ==
Chen obtained a degree in nuclear physics in 1970 from Peking University. He received a doctorate degree in physics from the Massachusetts Institute of Technology.

In 1982, he joined the European Organization for Nuclear Research and has been working on CERN's L3 experiment. He is the head of command and engineering manager at the China Spallation Neutron Source.

He received the 2013 Helmholtz International Fellow Award, and in 2005, he was elected a member of the Chinese Academy of Sciences.
