= Flux qubit =

Superconducting qubit implementation

In quantum computing, more specifically in superconducting quantum computing, flux qubits (also known as persistent current qubits) are micrometer sized loops of superconducting metal that is interrupted by a number of Josephson junctions. These devices function as quantum bits. The flux qubit was first proposed by Terry P. Orlando et al. at MIT in 1999 and fabricated shortly thereafter. During fabrication, the Josephson junction parameters are engineered so that a persistent current will flow continuously when an external magnetic flux is applied. Only an integer number of flux quanta are allowed to penetrate the superconducting ring, resulting in clockwise or counter-clockwise mesoscopic supercurrents (typically 300 nA) in the loop to compensate (screen or enhance) a non-integer external flux bias. When the applied flux through the loop area is close to a half integer number of flux quanta, the two lowest energy eigenstates of the loop will be a quantum superposition of the clockwise and counter-clockwise currents. The two lowest energy eigenstates differ only by the relative quantum phase between the composing current-direction states. Higher energy eigenstates correspond to much larger (macroscopic) persistent currents, that induce an additional flux quantum to the qubit loop, thus are well separated energetically from the lowest two eigenstates. This separation, known as the "qubit non linearity" criteria, allows operations with the two lowest eigenstates only, effectively creating a two level system. Usually, the two lowest eigenstates will serve as the computational basis for the logical qubit.

SEM image of a 4-junction flux qubit fabricated at Royal Holloway University of London

Computational operations are performed by pulsing the qubit with microwave frequency radiation which has an energy comparable to that of the gap between the energy of the two basis states, similar to RF-SQUID. Properly selected pulse duration and strength can put the qubit into a quantum superposition of the two basis states while subsequent pulses can manipulate the probability weighting that the qubit will be measured in either of the two basis states, thus performing a computational operation.

== Fabrication ==
Flux qubits are fabricated using techniques similar to those used for microelectronics. The devices are usually made on silicon or sapphire wafers using electron beam lithography and metallic thin film evaporation processes. To create Josephson junctions, a technique known as shadow evaporation is normally used; this involves evaporating the source metal alternately at two angles through the lithography defined mask in the electron beam resist. This results in two overlapping layers of the superconducting metal, in between which a thin layer of insulator (normally aluminum oxide) is deposited.

Dr. Shcherbakova's group reported using niobium as the contacts for their flux qubits. Niobium is often used as the contact and is deposited by employing a sputtering technique and using optical lithography to pattern the contacts. An argon beam can then be used to reduce the oxide layer that forms on top of the contacts. The sample must be cooled during the etching process in order to keep the niobium contacts from melting. At this point, the aluminum layers can be deposited on top of the clean niobium surfaces. The aluminum is then deposited in two steps from alternating angles on the niobium contacts. An oxide layer forms between the two aluminum layers in order to create the Al/AlO_{x}/Al Josephson junction. In standard flux qubits, 3 or 4 Josephson junctions will be patterned around the loop.

Resonators can be fabricated to measure the readout of the flux qubit through a similar techniques. The resonator can be fabricated by e-beam lithography and CF_{4} reactive ion etching of thin films of niobium or a similar metal. The resonator could then be coupled to the flux qubit by fabricating the flux qubit at the end of the resonator.

== Parameters ==
The flux qubit is distinguished from other known types of superconducting qubit such as the charge qubit or phase qubit by the coupling energy and charging energy of its junctions. In the charge qubit regime the charging energy of the junctions dominates the coupling energy. In a Flux qubit the situation is reversed and the coupling energy dominates. Typically for a flux qubit the coupling energy is 10-100 times greater than the charging energy which allows the Cooper pairs to flow continuously around the loop, rather than tunnel discretely across the junctions like a charge qubit.

== Josephson junctions ==
In order for a superconducting circuit to function as a qubit, there needs to be a non-linear element. If the circuit has a harmonic oscillator, such as in an LC-circuit, the energy levels are degenerate. This prohibits the formation of a two qubit computational space because any microwave radiation that is applied to manipulate the ground state and the first excited state to perform qubit operations would also excite the higher energy states. Josephson junctions are the only electronic element that are non-linear as well as non-dissipative at low temperatures. These are requirements for quantum integrated circuits, making the Josephson junction essential in the construction of flux qubits. Understanding the physics of the Josephson junction will improve comprehension of how flux qubits operate.

Essentially, Josephson junctions consist of two pieces of superconducting thin film that are separated by a layer of insulator. In the case of flux qubits, Josephson junctions are fabricated by the process that is described above. The wave functions of the superconducting components overlap, and this construction allows for the tunneling of electrons which creates a phase difference between the wave functions on either side of the insulating barrier. This phase difference that is equivalent to $\phi = \phi_2 - \phi_1$, where $\phi_1 , \phi_2$ correspond to the wave functions on either side of the tunneling barrier. For this phase difference, the following Josephson relations have been established:

$I_J = I_0\sin\phi$

$V = \frac{\Phi_0}{2\pi}\frac{d\phi}{dt}$

Here, $I_J$ is the Josephson current and $\Phi_0$ is the flux quantum. By differentiating the current equation and using substitution, one obtains the Josephson inductance term $L_J$:

$L_J = \frac{\Phi_0}{2\pi I_0 \cos\phi}$

From these equations, it can be seen that the Josephson inductance term is non-linear from the cosine term in the denominator; because of this, the energy level spacings are no longer degenerate, restricting the dynamics of the system to the two qubit states. Because of the non-linearity of the Josephson junction, operations using microwaves can be performed on the two lowest energy eigenvalue states (the two qubit states) without exciting the higher energy states. This was previously referred to as the "qubit non linearity" criteria. Thus, Josephson junctions are an integral element of flux qubits and superconducting circuits in general.

== Coupling ==
Coupling between two or more qubits is essential to implement many-qubit gates. The two basic coupling mechanisms are the direct inductive coupling and coupling via a microwave resonator. In the direct coupling, the circulating currents of the qubits inductively affect one another - clockwise current in one qubit induces counter-clockwise current in the other. In the Pauli Matrices formalism, a σ_{z}σ_{z} term appears in the Hamiltonian, essential for the controlled NOT gate implementation. The direct coupling might be further enhanced by kinetic inductance, if the qubit loops are made to share an edge, so that the currents will flow through the same superconducting line. Inserting a Josephson junction on that joint line will add a Josephson inductance term, and increase the coupling even more. To implement a switchable coupling in the direct coupling mechanism, as required to implement a gate of finite duration, an intermediate coupling loop may be used. The control magnetic flux applied to the coupler loop switches the coupling on and off, as implemented, for example, in the D-Wave Systems machines. The second method of coupling uses an intermediate microwave cavity resonator, commonly implemented in a coplanar waveguide geometry. By tuning the energy separation of the qubits to match that of the resonator, the phases of the loop currents are synchronized, and a σ_{x}σ_{x} coupling is implemented. Tuning the qubits in and out of resonance (for example, by modifying their bias magnetic flux) controls the duration of the gate operation.

== Readout ==
Like all quantum bits, flux qubits require a suitably sensitive probe coupled to it in order to measure its state after a computation has been carried out. Such quantum probes should introduce as little back-action as possible onto the qubit during measurement. Ideally they should be decoupled during computation and then turned "on" for a short time during read-out. Read-out probes for flux qubits work by interacting with one of the qubit's macroscopic variables, such as the circulating current, the flux within the loop or the macroscopic phase of the superconductor. This interaction then changes some variable of the read-out probe which can be measured using conventional low-noise electronics. The read-out probe is typically the technology aspect that separates the research of different University groups working on flux qubits.

Prof. Mooij's group at Delft in the Netherlands, along with collaborators, has pioneered flux qubit technology, and were the first to conceive, propose and implement flux qubits as they are known today. The Delft read-out scheme is based on a SQUID loop that is inductively coupled to the qubit, the qubit's state influences the critical current of the SQUID. The critical current can then be read-out using ramped measurement currents through the SQUID. Recently the group has used the plasma frequency of the SQUID as the read-out variable.

Dr. Il'ichev's group at IPHT Jena in Germany are using impedance measurement techniques based on the flux qubit influencing the resonant properties of a high quality tank circuit, which, like the Delft group is also inductively coupled to the qubit. In this scheme the qubit's magnetic susceptibility, which is defined by its state, changes the phase angle between the current and voltage when a small A.C. signal is passed into the tank circuit.

Prof. Petrashov's group at Royal Holloway are using an Andreev interferometer probe to read out flux qubits. This read-out uses the phase influence of a superconductor on the conductance properties of a normal metal. A length of normal metal is connected at either end to either side of the qubit using superconducting leads, the phase across the qubit, which is defined by its state, is translated into the normal metal, the resistance of which is then read-out using low noise resistance measurements.

Dr. Jerger's group uses resonators that are coupled with the flux qubit. Each resonator is dedicated to just one qubit, and all resonators can be measured with a single transmission line. The state of the flux qubit alters the resonant frequency of the resonator due to a dispersive shift that is picked up by the resonator from the coupling with the flux qubit. The resonant frequency is then measured by the transmission line for each resonator in the circuit. The state of the flux qubit is then determined by the measured shift in the resonant frequency.
