= Transmon =

Superconducting qubit implementation

Eigenenergies $E_m$(first three levels, $m = 0, 1, 2$) of the qubit Hamiltonian as a function of the effective offset charge $n_g$ for different ratios $E_J/E_c$. Energies are given in units of the transition energy $E_{01}$, evaluated at the degeneracy point $n_g = 0.5$. The zero point of energy is chosen as the bottom of the $m = 0$ level. The charge qubit (small $E_J / E_c$, top) is normally operated at the $n_g = 0.5$ "sweet spot" where fluctuations cause less energy shift and the anharmonicity is maximal. Transmon (large $E_J / E_c$, bottom) energy levels are insensitive to fluctuations but the anharmonicity is reduced.

In quantum computing, and more specifically in superconducting quantum computing, a transmon is a type of superconducting charge qubit designed to have reduced sensitivity to charge noise. The transmon was developed by Jens Koch, Terri M. Yu, Jay Gambetta, Andrew Houck, David Schuster, Johannes Majer, Alexandre Blais, Michel Devoret, Steven M. Girvin, and Robert J. Schoelkopf at Yale University and Université de Sherbrooke in 2007. Its name is an abbreviation of the term transmission line shunted plasma oscillation qubit; one which consists of a Cooper-pair box "where the two superconductors are also [capacitively] shunted in order to decrease the sensitivity to charge noise, while maintaining a sufficient anharmonicity for selective qubit control".

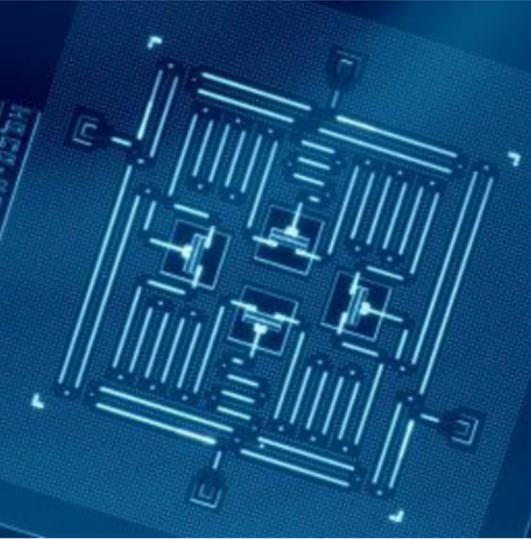
A device consisting of four transmon qubits, four quantum buses, and four readout resonators fabricated by IBM and published in npj Quantum Information in January 2017.

The transmon achieves its reduced sensitivity to charge noise by significantly increasing the ratio of the Josephson energy to the charging energy. This is accomplished through the use of a large shunting capacitor. The result is energy level spacings that are approximately independent of offset charge. Planar on-chip transmon qubits have T_{1} coherence times approximately 30 μs to 40 μs. Recent work has shown significantly improved T_{1} times as long as 95 μs by replacing the superconducting transmission line cavity with a three-dimensional superconducting cavity, and by replacing niobium with tantalum in the transmon device, T_{1} is further improved up to 0.3 ms. These results demonstrate that previous T_{1} times were not limited by Josephson junction losses. Understanding the fundamental limits on the coherence time in superconducting qubits such as the transmon is an active area of research.

== Comparison to Cooper-pair box ==
The transmon design is similar to the first design of the charge qubit known as a "Cooper-pair box"; both are described by the same Hamiltonian, with the only difference being the $E_{\rm J}/E_{\rm C}$ ratio. Here $E_{\rm J}$ is the Josephson energy of the junction, and $E_{\rm C}$ is the charging energy inversely proportional to the total capacitance of the qubit circuit. Transmons typically have $E_{\mathrm J}/E_{\mathrm C} \gg 1$ (while $E_{\mathrm J}/E_{\mathrm C} \lesssim 1$ for typical Cooper-pair-box qubits), which is achieved by shunting the Josephson junction with an additional large capacitor.

The benefit of increasing the $E_{\rm J}/E_{\rm C}$ ratio is the insensitivity to charge noise—the energy levels become independent of the offset charge $n_g$ across the junction; thus the dephasing time of the qubit is prolonged. The disadvantage is the reduced anharmonicity $\alpha = (E_{21}-E_{10})/E_{10}$, where $E_{ij}$ is the energy difference between eigenstates $|i\rangle$ and $| j \rangle$. Reduced anharmonicity complicates the device operation as a two level system, e.g. exciting the device from the ground state to the first excited state by a resonant pulse also populates the higher excited state. This complication is overcome by complex microwave pulse design, that takes into account the higher energy levels, and prohibits their excitation by destructive interference. Also, while the variation of $E_{10}$with respect to $n_g$ tend to decrease exponentially with $E_{\mathrm J}/ E_{\mathrm C}$, the anharmonicity only has a weaker, algebraic dependence on $E_{\mathrm J}/E_{\mathrm C}$ as $\sim (E_{\mathrm J}/E_{\mathrm C})^{-1/2}$. The significant gain in the coherence time outweigh the decrease in the anharmonicity for controlling the states with high fidelity.

Measurement, control and coupling of transmons is performed by means of microwave resonators with techniques from circuit quantum electrodynamics also applicable to other superconducting qubits. Coupling to the resonators is done by placing a capacitor between the qubit and the resonator, at a point where the resonator electromagnetic field is greatest. For example, in IBM Quantum Experience devices, the resonators are implemented with "quarter wave" coplanar waveguides with maximal field at the signal-ground short at the waveguide end; thus every IBM transmon qubit has a long resonator "tail". The initial proposal included similar transmission line resonators coupled to every transmon, becoming a part of the name. However, charge qubits operated at a similar $E_{\rm J}/E_{\rm C}$ regime, coupled to different kinds of microwave cavities are referred to as transmons as well.

== Applications ==
=== Superconducting quantum processors ===
Transmons are the default qubit in most large scale quantum processors, including Google's Willow processor, a chip with 105 physical transmon qubits. Other companies that use transmon qubits include IBM, Rigetti, and IQM.

=== Bosonic or hybrid quantum memory ===
While most quantum computation systems are qubit-based, an alternative method is to use harmonic oscillator modes, or bosonic modes, as the logical subspace. In such systems, transmons are used as ancillas for universal control of the cavity's bosonic modes. This allows for physical realizations of oscillator-based error correction codes. These codes are known as 'bosonic codes'.

=== Transmons as qudits instead of qubits ===
Transmons have been explored for use as d-dimensional qudits via the additional energy levels that naturally occur above the qubit subspace (the lowest two states). For example, the lowest three levels can be used to make a transmon qutrit; in the early 2020s, researchers have reported realizations of single-qutrit quantum gates on transmons as well as two-qutrit entangling gates. Entangling gates on transmons have also been explored theoretically and in simulations for the general case of qudits of arbitrary d.

== See also ==
- Charge qubit
- Anharmonicity
- Circuit quantum electrodynamics (cQED)
- Dilution refrigerator
- List of quantum processors
- Quantum harmonic oscillator
- Superconducting quantum computing
