= Kinetic inductance =

Manifestation of inertial mass of mobile charge carriers

Kinetic inductance is the manifestation of the inertial mass of mobile charge carriers in alternating electric fields as an equivalent series inductance. Kinetic inductance is observed in high carrier mobility conductors (e.g. superconductors) and at very high frequencies.

== Explanation ==
A change in electromotive force (emf) will be opposed by the inertia of the charge carriers since, like all objects with mass, they prefer to be traveling at constant velocity; therefore it takes a finite time to accelerate the particle. This is similar to how a change in emf is opposed by the finite rate of change of magnetic flux in an inductor. The resulting phase lag in voltage is identical for both energy storage mechanisms, making them indistinguishable in a normal circuit.

Kinetic inductance ($L_{K}$) arises naturally in the Drude model of electrical conduction considering not only the DC conductivity but also the finite relaxation time (collision time) $\tau$ of the mobile charge carriers when it is not tiny compared to the wave period 1/f. This model defines a complex conductance at radian frequency ω=2πf given by ${\sigma(\omega) = \sigma_{1} - i\sigma_{2}}$. The imaginary part, -σ_{2}, represents the kinetic inductance. The Drude complex conductivity can be expanded into its real and imaginary components:

$\sigma = \frac{ne^2\tau}{m(1+i\omega\tau)} = \frac{n e^2 \tau}{m} \left(\frac{1}{1+\omega^2\tau^2}-i\frac{\omega\tau}{1+\omega^2\tau^2} \right)$

where $m$ is the mass of the charge carrier (i.e. the effective electron mass in metallic conductors) and $n$ is the carrier number density. In normal metals the collision time is typically $\approx 10^{-14}$ s, so for frequencies < 100 GHz ${\omega \tau}$ is very small and can be ignored; then this equation reduces to the DC conductance $\sigma_0 = ne^2\tau/m$. Kinetic inductance is therefore only significant at optical frequencies, and in superconductors whose ${\tau \rightarrow \infty}$.

For a superconducting wire of cross-sectional area $A$, the kinetic inductance of a segment of length $l$ can be calculated by equating the total kinetic energy of the Cooper pairs in that region with an equivalent inductive energy due to the wire's current $I$:

$\frac{1}{2}(2m_e v^2)(n_{s}lA)=\frac{1}{2}L_KI^2$

where $m_e$ is the electron mass ($2m_e$ is the mass of a Cooper pair), $v$ is the average Cooper pair velocity, $n_{s}$ is the density of Cooper pairs, $l$ is the length of the wire, $A$ is the wire cross-sectional area, and $I$ is the current. Using the fact that the current $I = 2evn_{s}A$, where $e$ is the electron charge, this yields:

$L_K=\left(\frac{m_e}{2n_{s}e^2}\right)\left(\frac{l}{A}\right)$

The same procedure can be used to calculate the kinetic inductance of a normal (i.e. non-superconducting) wire, except with $2m_e$ replaced by $m_e$, $2e$ replaced by $e$, and $n_{s}$ replaced by the normal carrier density $n$. This yields:

$L_K=\left(\frac{m_e}{ne^2}\right)\left(\frac{l}{A}\right)$

The kinetic inductance increases as the carrier density decreases. Physically, this is because a smaller number of carriers must have a proportionally greater velocity than a larger number of carriers in order to produce the same current, whereas their energy increases according to the square of velocity. The resistivity also increases as the carrier density $n$ decreases, thereby maintaining a constant ratio (and thus phase angle) between the (kinetic) inductive and resistive components of a wire's impedance for a given frequency. That ratio, $\omega \tau$, is tiny in normal metals up to terahertz frequencies.

In two-dimensional conductors with quadratic electron energy dispersion with an effective electron mass of $m_e$, the kinetic inductance is given by

$L_K=\left(\frac{m_e}{ne^2}\right)\left(\frac{l}{W}\right)$

where $n$ is the electron density per unit area and $W$ is the width of the two-dimensional conductor. The kinetic inductance is especially pronounced in two-dimensional conductors. In graphene where individual electron mass is zero, still the kinetic inductance exists due to the collective inertia of electrons, where it is given by

$L_K=\left(\frac{\pi\hbar^2}{e^2 \epsilon_F}\right)\left(\frac{l}{W}\right)$

Here $\epsilon_F$ is the Fermi energy.

== Applications ==
Kinetic inductance is the principle of operation of the highly sensitive photodetectors known as kinetic inductance detectors (KIDs). The change in the Cooper pair density brought about by the absorption of a single photon in a strip of superconducting material produces a measurable change in its kinetic inductance.

Kinetic inductance is also used in a design parameter for superconducting flux qubits: $\beta$ is the ratio of the kinetic inductance of the Josephson junctions in the qubit to the geometrical inductance of the flux qubit. A design with a low beta behaves more like a simple inductive loop, while a design with a high beta is dominated by the Josephson junctions and has more hysteretic behavior.

== Early history ==
An early attempt at measuring kinetic inductance was made by Heinrich Hertz in 1880. He found that the kinetic energy associated with 1 emu of current in 1 mm^{3} of a copper wire was less than 0.008 mg·mm.

== See also ==
- Drude model
- Electrical conduction
- Electron mobility
- Superconductivity
