= Quantum bus =

Device to store or transfer information in quantum computing

A quantum bus is a device which can be used to store or transfer information between independent qubits in a quantum computer, or combine two qubits into a superposition. It is the quantum analog of a classical bus.

There are several physical systems that can be used to realize a quantum bus, including trapped ions, photons, and superconducting qubits. Trapped ions, for example, can use the quantized motion of ions (phonons) as a quantum bus, while photons can act as a carrier of quantum information by utilizing the increased interaction strength provided by cavity quantum electrodynamics. Circuit quantum electrodynamics, which uses superconducting qubits coupled to a microwave cavity on a chip, is another example of a quantum bus that has been successfully demonstrated in experiments.

== History ==
The concept was first demonstrated by researchers at Yale University and the National Institute of Standards and Technology (NIST) in 2007. Prior to this experimental demonstration, the quantum bus had been described by scientists at NIST as one of the possible cornerstone building blocks in quantum computing architectures.

== Mathematical description ==
A quantum bus for superconducting qubits can be built with a resonance cavity. The hamiltonian for a system with qubit A, qubit B, and the resonance cavity or quantum bus connecting the two is $\hat{H}=\hat{H}_r+\sum\limits_{j=A,B} \hat{H}_j +\sum\limits_{j=A,B}hg_i\left(\hat{a}^\dagger\hat{\sigma}^j_-+\hat{a}\hat{\sigma}^j_{\text{+}}\right)$ where $\hat{H}_j = \frac{1}{2}\hbar\omega_j\hat{\sigma}^j_+\hat{\sigma}^j_-$ is the single qubit hamiltonian, $\hat{\sigma}^j_+\hat{\sigma}^j_-$ is the raising or lowering operator for creating or destroying excitations in the $j$th qubit, and $\hbar\omega_j$ is controlled by the amplitude of the D.C. and radio frequency flux bias.
