= Circuit quantum electrodynamics =

Means of studying the interaction of light and matter

Circuit quantum electrodynamics (circuit QED) provides a means of studying the fundamental interaction between light and matter (quantum optics). As in the field of cavity quantum electrodynamics, a single photon within a single mode cavity coherently couples to a quantum object (atom). In contrast to cavity QED, the photon is stored in a one-dimensional on-chip resonator and the quantum object is no natural atom but an artificial one. These artificial atoms usually are mesoscopic devices which exhibit an atom-like energy spectrum. The field of circuit QED is a prominent example for quantum information processing and a promising candidate for future quantum computation.

In the late 2010s decade, experiments involving cQED in 3 dimensions have demonstrated deterministic gate teleportation and other operations on multiple qubits.

== Resonator ==
The resonant devices in the circuit QED architecture can be implemented using a superconducting LC resonator, a high purity cavity, or a superconducting coplanar waveguide microwave resonators, which are two-dimensional microwave analogues of the Fabry–Pérot interferometer, in which the capacitance and inductances are distributed. Coplanar waveguides consist of a signal carrying centerline flanked by two grounded planes. This planar structure is put on a dielectric substrate by a photolithographic process. Superconducting materials used are mostly aluminium (Al), niobium (Nb) and lately tantalum (Ta). Dielectrics typically used as substrates are either surface oxidized silicon (Si) or sapphire (Al_{2}O_{3}). The line impedance is given by the geometric properties, which are chosen to match the 50 $\Omega$ of the peripheric microwave equipment to avoid partial reflection of the signal. The electric field is basically confined between the center conductor and the ground planes resulting in a very small mode volume $V_m$ which gives rise to very high electric fields per photon $E_0$ (compared to three-dimensional cavities). Mathematically, the field $E_0$ can be found as

$E_0=\sqrt{\frac{\hbar\omega_r}{2 \varepsilon_0 V_m}}$,

where $\hbar$ is the reduced Planck constant, $\omega_r$ is the angular frequency, and $\varepsilon_0$ is the permittivity of free space.

One can distinguish between two different types of resonators: $\lambda/2$ and $\lambda/4$ resonators. Half-wavelength resonators are made by breaking the center conductor at two spots with the distance $\ell$. The resulting piece of center conductor is in this way capacitively coupled to the input and output and represents a resonator with $E$-field antinodes at its ends. Quarter-wavelength resonators are short pieces of a coplanar line, which are shorted to ground on one end and capacitively coupled to a feed line on the other. The resonance frequencies are given by

$\lambda/2: \quad \nu_n=\frac{c}{\sqrt{\varepsilon_{\text{eff}}}}\frac{n}{2 \ell} \quad (n=1,2,3,\ldots) \qquad \lambda/4:\quad \nu_n=\frac{c}{\sqrt{\varepsilon_{\text{eff}}}}\frac{2n+1}{4 \ell} \quad (n=0,1,2,\ldots)$

with $\varepsilon_{\text{eff}}$ being the effective dielectric permittivity of the device.

== Artificial atoms and qubits ==
The first realized artificial atom in circuit QED was the so-called Cooper-pair box, also known as the charge qubit. In this device, a reservoir of Cooper pairs is coupled via Josephson junctions to a gated superconducting island. The state of the Cooper-pair box (qubit) is given by the number of Cooper pairs on the island ($N$ Cooper pairs for the ground state $\mid g \rangle$ and $N+1$ for the excited state $\mid e \rangle$). By controlling the Coulomb energy (bias voltage) and the Josephson energy (flux bias) the transition frequency $\omega_a$ is tuned. Due to the nonlinearity of the Josephson junctions the Cooper-pair box shows an atom like energy spectrum. Other more recent examples for qubits used in circuit QED are so called transmon qubits (more charge noise insensitive compared to the Cooper-pair box) and flux qubits (whose state is given by the direction of a supercurrent in a superconducting loop intersected by Josephson junctions). All of these devices feature very large dipole moments $d$ (up to 10^{3} times that of large $n$ Rydberg atoms), which qualifies them as extremely suitable coupling counterparts for the light field in circuit QED.

Due to the intrinsic nonlinearity of the Josephson junctions, the Cooper-pair box exhibits an atom-like energy spectrum with unequally spaced energy levels. This anharmonicity is crucial for selective addressing of specific transitions while avoiding unwanted excitations to higher energy levels, a fundamental requirement for two-level qubit operation. The nonlinear inductance provided by the Josephson junction creates an effective potential landscape with discrete quantum energy levels, analogous to the bound states of electrons in natural atoms.

However, the charge qubit suffers from significant sensitivity to charge noise in the environment, which manifests as fluctuations in the gate voltage and leads to rapid dephasing. This fundamental limitation motivated the development of more sophisticated qubit designs that maintain the benefits of Josephson junction nonlinearity while reducing environmental sensitivity.

Other more recent examples of artificial atoms used in circuit QED include the highly successful Transmon qubits (which exhibit dramatically reduced charge noise sensitivity compared to the Cooper-pair box) and flux qubits (whose quantum state is encoded in the direction of a supercurrent circulating in a superconducting loop interrupted by Josephson junctions).

The transmon operates fundamentally different from the original charge qubit design. This parameter regime leads to exponential suppression of charge dispersion while maintaining sufficient anharmonicity for selective qubit control. The transmon has become the workhorse of many leading quantum computing platforms due to its exceptional coherence properties, with recent demonstrations achieving coherence times exceeding 100 μs.

Flux qubits, in contrast, encode quantum information in the persistent current states of a superconducting loop containing multiple Josephson junctions. These devices can be operated at the "flux sweet spot" where they become maximally insensitive to flux noise, analogous to the charge sweet spot operation of Cooper-pair boxes. Recent experiments have demonstrated flux qubits in planar circuit QED architectures with impressive coherence properties and strong cavity coupling.

All of these superconducting qubit architectures feature extraordinarily large electric dipole moments d, reaching values up to 10³ times larger than those of natural atoms such as Rydberg atoms with large principal quantum numbers. This enormous enhancement arises from the macroscopic nature of the superconducting circuit elements and the large spatial extent of the Cooper pair wavefunctions. The dipole moment for a charge qubit can be estimated as d ≈ 2e × (spatial separation of charge states), which for typical device geometries yields dipole moments on the order of 10² - 10³ times the elementary charge times an angstrom.

These exceptionally large dipole moments make superconducting qubits extremely suitable coupling counterparts for the quantized electromagnetic field in circuit QED architectures. The strong coupling between the artificial atom and the cavity mode enables rapid quantum state manipulation, high-fidelity quantum gates, and efficient quantum state readout. Furthermore, the large dipole moments facilitate the exploration of previously inaccessible parameter regimes such as ultrastrong coupling, where the light-matter coupling strength becomes a significant fraction of the cavity and qubit transition frequencies.

The engineering flexibility of superconducting qubits extends beyond simple two-level systems. Recent theoretical and experimental work has explored multi-level artificial atoms, including qutrit implementations and more complex multilevel systems that can emulate the behavior of natural atoms with multiple accessible energy levels. The ability to engineer the energy level structure, transition matrix elements, and environmental coupling of these artificial atoms provides unprecedented control over light–matter interactions in the quantum regime.

Modern fabrication techniques for superconducting qubits have evolved to include advanced methods such as electron beam lithography, shadow evaporation for creating ultra-clean Josephson junctions, and atomic layer deposition for precise control of tunnel barrier properties. These techniques enable the creation of highly reproducible devices with predictable parameters, essential for scalable quantum computing architectures.

The integration of superconducting qubits with high-quality microwave resonators has opened new avenues for quantum simulation, quantum error correction, and hybrid quantum systems. The strong, controllable coupling between artificial atoms and cavity photons serves as the foundation for distributed quantum networks, quantum memories, and novel quantum sensing protocols. The field continues to advance rapidly, with recent demonstrations of quantum processors containing hundreds of superconducting qubits and the achievement of quantum computational advantage for specific problem classes.

== Theory ==
The full quantum description of matter-light interaction is given by the Jaynes–Cummings model. The three terms of the Jaynes–Cummings model can be ascribed to a cavity term, which is mimicked by a harmonic oscillator, an atomic term and an interaction term.

$\mathcal{H}_{\text{JC}}=\underbrace{\hbar \omega_r \left(a^\dagger a+\frac 12\right)}_{\text{cavity term}}+\underbrace{\frac 12 \hbar \omega_a \sigma_z}_{\text{atomic term}}+\underbrace{\hbar g \left(\sigma_+ a+a^\dagger \sigma_-\right)}_{\text{interaction term}}$

In this formulation $\omega_r$ is the resonance frequency of the cavity and $a^\dagger$ and $a$ are photon creation and annihilation operators, respectively. The atomic term is given by the Hamiltonian of a spin-1/2 system with $\omega_a$ being the transition frequency and $\sigma_z$ the Pauli matrix. The operators $\sigma_\pm$ are raising and lowering operators (ladder operators) for the atomic states. For the case of zero detuning ($\omega_r=\omega_a$) the interaction lifts the degeneracy of the photon number state $\mid n \rangle$ and the atomic states $\mid g \rangle$ and $\mid e \rangle$ and pairs of dressed states are formed. These new states are superpositions of cavity and atom states

$\mid n,\pm \rangle=\frac 1{\sqrt 2}\left(\mid g\rangle \mid n \rangle\pm \mid e\rangle \mid n-1\rangle\right)$

and are energetically split by $2g\sqrt n$. If the detuning is significantly larger than the combined cavity and atomic linewidth the cavity states are merely shifted by $\pm g^2/\Delta$ (with the detuning $\Delta=\omega_a-\omega_r$) depending on the atomic state. This provides the possibility to read out the atomic (qubit) state by measuring the transition frequency.

The coupling is given by $g=E \cdot d$ (for electric dipolar coupling). If the coupling is much larger than the cavity loss rate $\kappa=\frac{\omega_r}Q$ (quality factor $Q$; the higher $Q$, the longer the photon remains inside the resonator) as well as the decoherence rate $\gamma$ (rate at which the qubit relaxes into modes other than the resonator mode) the strong coupling regime is reached. Due to the high fields and low losses of the coplanar resonators together with the large dipole moments and long decoherence times of the qubits, the strong coupling regime can easily be reached in the field of circuit QED. Combination of the Jaynes–Cummings model and the coupled cavities leads to the Jaynes–Cummings–Hubbard model.

Due to the very high electric fields per photon in coplanar waveguide resonators, together with the large dipole moments and long coherence times of artificial atoms (qubits), the strong coupling regime is readily achieved in circuit QED architectures. This makes it a leading platform for quantum information processing and quantum simulation.

== See also ==
- Superconducting radio frequency
