= Npj Quantum Information =

Journal

npj Quantum Information
- Discipline: Quantum information science
- Language: English
- Edited by: Sven Rogge and Dan Browne

Publication details
- History: 2015-present
- Publisher: Nature Publishing Group
- Frequency: Continuous
- Open access: Yes
- License: CC-BY
- Impact factor: 8.3 (2024)

Standard abbreviations
- ISO 4: npj Quantum Inf.

Indexing
- ISSN: 2056-6387
- OCLC no.: 932114066

Links
- Journal homepage; Online archive

npj Quantum Information is a peer-reviewed open-access scientific journal covering quantum information science.

== History ==
It was established in 2015, launched by Australian Education Minister Christopher Pyne.

== Description ==
It is published by the Nature Publishing Group. Australian quantum physicist Michelle Simmons (University of New South Wales) is founding editor-in-chief.

Its coverage includes quantum mechanical aspects of computing, communications, information theory, metrology, sensing, and cryptography.

== Abstracting and indexing ==
The journal is abstracted and indexed in Current Contents/Physical Chemical and Earth Sciences, the Science Citation Index Expanded, and Scopus.
