= Anharmonicity =

Deviation of a physical system from being a harmonic oscillator

Potential energy of a diatomic molecule as a function of atomic spacing. When the molecules are too close or too far away, they experience a restoring force back towards u_{0}. (Imagine a marble rolling back and forth in the depression.) The blue curve is close in shape to the molecule's actual potential well, while the red parabola is a good approximation for small oscillations. The red approximation treats the molecule as a harmonic oscillator, because the restoring force, -V'(u), is linear with respect to the displacement u.

In classical mechanics, anharmonicity is the deviation of a system from being a harmonic oscillator. An oscillator that is not oscillating in harmonic motion is known as an anharmonic oscillator where the system can be approximated to a harmonic oscillator and the anharmonicity can be calculated using perturbation theory. If the anharmonicity is large, then other numerical techniques have to be used. In reality all oscillating systems are anharmonic, but most approximate the harmonic oscillator the smaller the amplitude of the oscillation is.

As a result, oscillations with frequencies $2\omega$ and $3\omega$ etc., where $\omega$ is the fundamental frequency of the oscillator, appear. Furthermore, the frequency $\omega$ deviates from the frequency $\omega_0$ of the harmonic oscillations. See also intermodulation and combination tones. As a first approximation, the frequency shift $\Delta \omega=\omega-\omega_0$ is proportional to the square of the oscillation amplitude $A$:

$$\Delta \omega\propto A^2$$

In a system of oscillators with natural frequencies $\omega_\alpha$, $\omega_\beta$, ... anharmonicity results in additional oscillations with frequencies $\omega_\alpha\pm \omega_\beta$.

Anharmonicity also modifies the energy profile of the resonance curve, leading to interesting phenomena such as the foldover effect and superharmonic resonance.

== General principle ==
2 DOF elastic pendulum exhibiting anharmonic behavior.

Harmonic vs. Anharmonic Oscillators

The "block-on-a-spring" is a classic example of harmonic oscillation. Depending on the block's location, x, it will experience a restoring force toward the middle. The restoring force is proportional to x, so the system exhibits simple harmonic motion.

A pendulum is a simple anharmonic oscillator. Depending on the mass's angular position θ, a restoring force pushes coordinate θ back towards the middle. This oscillator is anharmonic because the restoring force is not proportional to θ, but to sin(θ). Because the linear function y = θ approximates the nonlinear function y = sin(θ) when θ is small, the system can be modeled as a harmonic oscillator for small oscillations.

An oscillator is a physical system characterized by periodic motion, such as a pendulum, tuning fork, or vibrating diatomic molecule. Mathematically speaking, the essential feature of an oscillator is that for some coordinate x of the system, a force whose magnitude depends on x will push x away from extreme values and back toward some central value x_{0}, causing x to oscillate between extremes. For example, x may represent the displacement of a pendulum from its resting position x=0. As the absolute value of x increases, so does the restoring force acting on the pendulums weight that pushes it back towards its resting position.

In harmonic oscillators, the restoring force is proportional in magnitude (and opposite in direction) to the displacement of x from its natural position x_{0}. The resulting differential equation implies that x must oscillate sinusoidally over time, with a period of oscillation that is inherent to the system. x may oscillate with any amplitude, but will always have the same period.

Anharmonic oscillators, however, are characterized by the nonlinear dependence of the restorative force on the displacement x. Consequently, the anharmonic oscillator's period of oscillation may depend on its amplitude of oscillation.

As a result of the nonlinearity of anharmonic oscillators, the vibration frequency can change, depending upon the system's displacement. These changes in the vibration frequency result in energy being coupled from the fundamental vibration frequency to other frequencies through a process known as parametric coupling.

Treating the nonlinear restorative force as a function F(x − x_{0}) of the displacement of x from its natural position, we may replace F by its linear approximation F_{1} = F′(0) ⋅ (x−x_{0}) at zero displacement. The approximating function F_{1} is linear, so it will describe simple harmonic motion. Further, this function F_{1} is accurate when x − x_{0} is small. For this reason, anharmonic motion can be approximated as harmonic motion as long as the oscillations are small.

== Examples in physics ==
There are many systems throughout the physical world that can be modeled as anharmonic oscillators in addition to the nonlinear mass-spring system. For example, an atom, which consists of a positively charged nucleus surrounded by a negatively charged electronic cloud, experiences a displacement between the center of mass of the nucleus and the electronic cloud when an electric field is present. The amount of that displacement, called the electric dipole moment, is related linearly to the applied field for small fields, but as the magnitude of the field is increased, the field-dipole moment relationship becomes nonlinear, just as in the mechanical system.

Further examples of anharmonic oscillators include the large-angle pendulum; nonequilibrium semiconductors that possess a large hot carrier population, which exhibit nonlinear behaviors of various types related to the effective mass of the carriers; and ionospheric plasmas, which also exhibit nonlinear behavior based on the anharmonicity of the plasma, transversal oscillating strings. In fact, virtually all oscillators become anharmonic when their pump amplitude increases beyond some threshold, and as a result it is necessary to use nonlinear equations of motion to describe their behavior.

Anharmonicity plays a role in lattice and molecular vibrations, in quantum oscillations, and in acoustics. The atoms in a molecule or a solid vibrate about their equilibrium positions. When these vibrations have small amplitudes they can be described by harmonic oscillators. However, when the vibrational amplitudes are large, for example at high temperatures, anharmonicity becomes important. An example of the effects of anharmonicity is the thermal expansion of solids, which is usually studied within the quasi-harmonic approximation. Studying vibrating anharmonic systems using quantum mechanics is a computationally demanding task because anharmonicity not only makes the potential experienced by each oscillator more complicated, but also introduces coupling between the oscillators. It is possible to use first-principles methods such as density-functional theory to map the anharmonic potential experienced by the atoms in both molecules and solids. Accurate anharmonic vibrational energies can then be obtained by solving the anharmonic vibrational equations for the atoms within a mean-field theory. Finally, it is possible to use Møller–Plesset perturbation theory to go beyond the mean-field formalism.

== Period of oscillations ==
Consider a mass $m$ moving in a potential well $U(x)$. The oscillation period may be derived
$$T = \sqrt{2m} \int_{x_{-}}^{x_{+}} \frac{dx}{\sqrt{E - U(x)}}$$
where the extremes of the motion are given by $x_{-} < x < x_{+}$ and $U(x_{-})=U(x_{+})=E$.

== See also ==
- Inharmonicity
- Harmonic oscillator
- Musical acoustics
- Nonlinear resonance
- Transmon
