= Tai-Kai Ng =

Tai-Kai Ng (Chinese: 吳大琪) is a physicist from Hong Kong.

Ng earned his bachelor's degree from the University of Hong Kong, then graduated from Northwestern University with a doctorate. He returned to Hong Kong for a professorship at the Hong Kong University of Science and Technology. In 2000, Ng was elected a fellow of the American Physical Society "[f]or his work on the Coulomb effects in a quantum dot, leading to the prediction of conductance enhancement due to the Kondo resonance."
