= Niemeyer–Dolan technique =

Nanofabrication method for overlapping structures

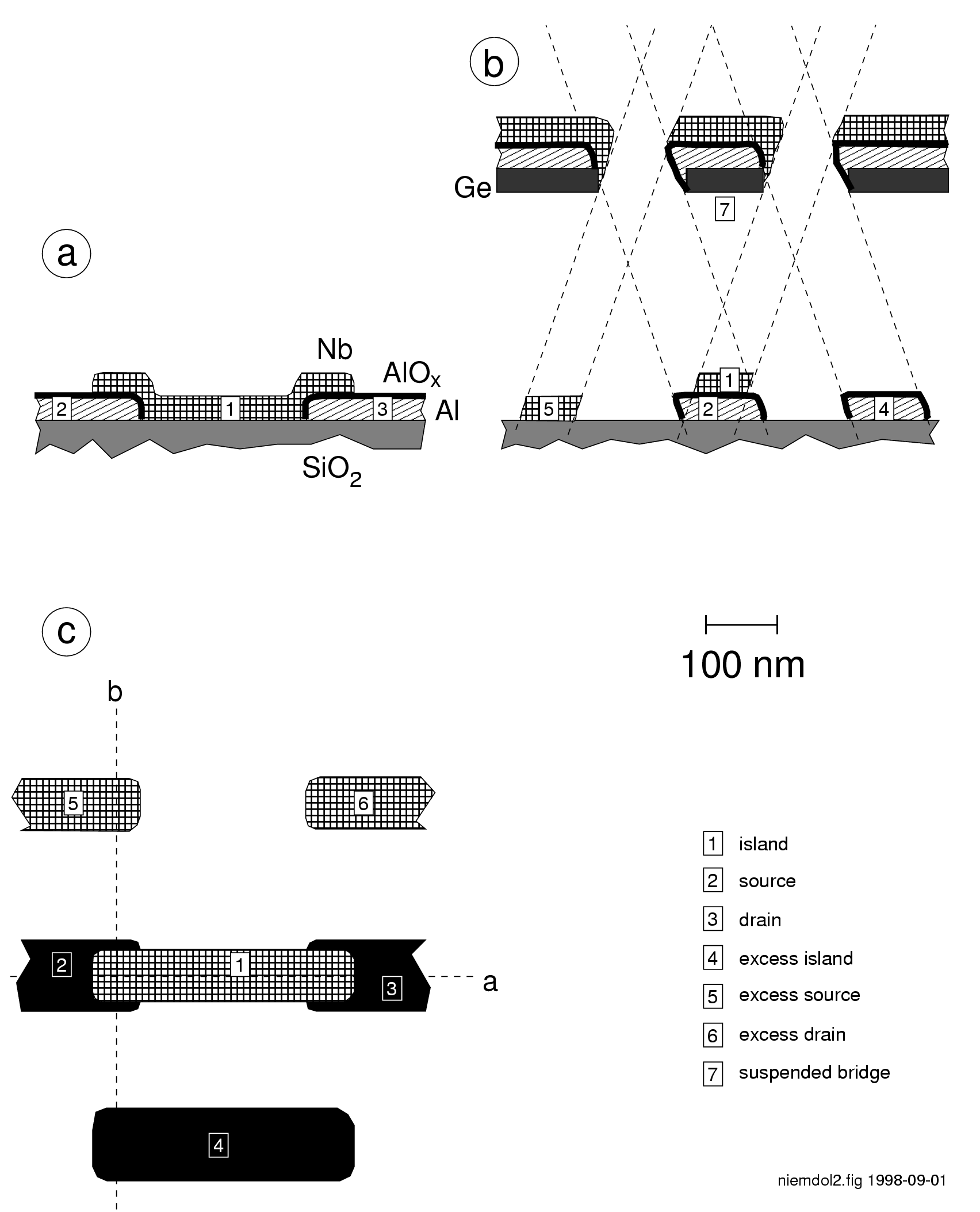
Niemeyer–Dolan technique for the fabrication of single electron transistors. (a) Side view, cut along the current path. (b) Side view, cut perpendicular to the current path, and showing the resist mask and the layers deposited on it during the evaporations (changing its cross section). (c) Top view, indicating the cut planes for views a and b.

The Niemeyer–Dolan technique, also called the Dolan technique, angular evaporation, or the shadow evaporation technique, is a thin-film lithographic method to create nanometer-sized overlapping structures.

This technique uses an evaporation mask that is suspended above the substrate (see figure). The evaporation mask can be formed from two or more layers of resist, to allow creation of the extreme undercut needed. Depending on the evaporation angle, the shadow image of the mask is projected onto different positions on the substrate. By carefully choosing the angle for each material to be deposited, adjacent openings in the mask can be projected onto the same spot, creating an overlay of two thin films with a well-defined geometry.

Efforts to create multilayered structures are complicated by a need to align each layer with those below it; as all openings are on the same mask, shadow evaporation reduces this need by being self-aligning. Additionally, this allows the substrate to be kept under high vacuum, as there is no need to increase pressure to switch between multiple masks. Due to its downsides, including restrictions on feature density from excess evaporated material, shadow evaporation is generally only suitable for very low scale integration.

== Usage ==
The Niemeyer–Dolan technique is used to create multi-layer thin-film electronic nanostructures such as quantum dots and tunnel junctions.
