= 2025 Nobel Prizes =

The 2025 Nobel Prizes were awarded by the Nobel Foundation, based in Sweden, and the Norwegian Nobel Institute, based in Oslo, to 14 individuals.

Six categories were awarded: Physics, Chemistry, Physiology or Medicine, Literature, Peace, and Economic Sciences.

== Prizes ==
Physics	(United States) John M. Martinis	"for the discovery of macroscopic quantum mechanical tunnelling and energy quantisation in an electric circuit"
Physics	(France) Michel Devoret	"for the discovery of macroscopic quantum mechanical tunnelling and energy quantisation in an electric circuit"
Physics	(United Kingdom) John Clarke	"for the discovery of macroscopic quantum mechanical tunnelling and energy quantisation in an electric circuit"
Chemistry	(United States) (Jordan) (Saudi Arabia) Omar M. Yaghi	"for the development of metal–organic frameworks"
Chemistry	(Japan) Susumu Kitagawa	"for the development of metal–organic frameworks"
Chemistry	(Australia) (United Kingdom) Richard Robson	"for the development of metal–organic frameworks"
Physiology or Medicine	(United States) Mary E. Brunkow	"for their discoveries concerning peripheral immune tolerance"
Physiology or Medicine	(United States) Fred Ramsdell	"for their discoveries concerning peripheral immune tolerance"
Physiology or Medicine	(Japan) Shimon Sakaguchi	"for their discoveries concerning peripheral immune tolerance"
Literature	(Hungary) László Krasznahorkai	"for his compelling and visionary oeuvre that, in the midst of apocalyptic terror, reaffirms the power of art"
Peace	(Venezuela) María Corina Machado	"for her tireless work promoting democratic rights for the people of Venezuela and for her struggle to achieve a just and peaceful transition from dictatorship to democracy"
Economic Sciences	(United States) (Netherlands) (Israel) Joel Mokyr	"for having identified the prerequisites for sustained growth through technological progress"
Economic Sciences	(France) Philippe Aghion	"for the theory of sustained growth through creative destruction" (Aghion–Howitt model)
Economic Sciences	(Canada) Peter Howitt	"for the theory of sustained growth through creative destruction" (Aghion–Howitt model)
