= Irfan Siddiqi =

American physicist

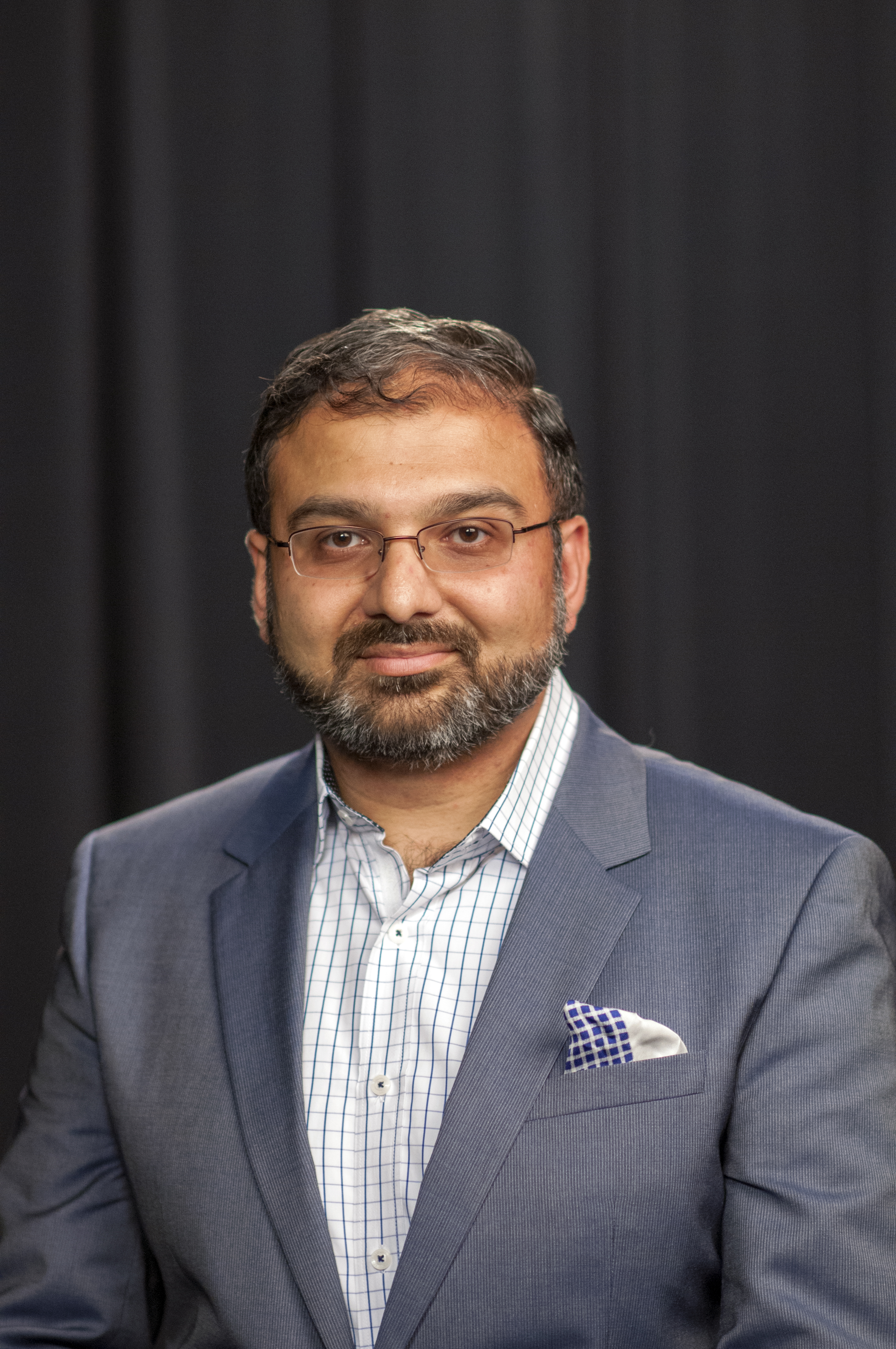
- Siddiqi in 2016
- Born: 4 March 1976 (age 50)
- Education: Harvard University; Yale University
- Known for: Josephson junction circuits
- Awards: APS George E. Valley Jr. Prize (2006); American Physical Society, Division of Condensed Matter Physics, Fellow (2015); Columbia Engineering Alumni Association Award; Distinguished Teaching Award, University of California, Berkeley (2016); Joseph F. Keithley Award For Advances in Measurement Science (2021)
- Scientific career
- Fields: Experimental Solid-state physics; Condensed Matter Physics
- Workplaces: University of California Berkeley
- Thesis: Critical Temperature Dependence of High Frequency Electron Dynamics in Superconducting Hot-Electron Bolometer Mixers (2002)
- Doctoral advisor: Daniel E. Prober

Irfan Siddiqi (born March 4, 1976) is an American physicist and currently a professor of physics at the University of California, Berkeley and a faculty scientist at Lawrence Berkeley National Laboratory (LBNL).

He currently is the director of the Quantum Nanoelectronics Laboratory at UC Berkeley and the Advanced Quantum Testbed at LBNL. Siddiqi is known for groundbreaking contributions to the field of superconducting quantum circuits, including dispersive single-shot readout of superconducting quantum bits, quantum feedback, observation of single quantum trajectories, and near-quantum limited microwave frequency amplification. In addition to other honors, for his pioneering work in superconducting devices, he was awarded with the American Physical Society George E. Valley, Jr. Prize in 2006, "for the development of the Josephson bifurcation amplifier for ultra-sensitive measurements at the quantum limit." Siddiqi is a fellow of the American Physical Society and a recipient of the UC Berkeley Distinguished Teaching Award in 2016.

== Biography ==
Siddiqi was born in Rawalpindi, Pakistan, and is a direct descendant of the well-known leader of the Khilafat Movement, Muslim activist, journalist and poet, Maulana Mohammad Ali Jauhar (Urdu: مَولانا مُحمّد علی جَوہر). Siddiqi moved to New York City at an early age. He attended the Bronx High School of Science, in the Bronx, NY, where he developed a strong interest in physics, chemistry, and mathematics. His aptitude in physics and mathematics led him to the Columbia University Science Honors Program. He went on to Harvard University to complete his undergraduate education, earning an A.B. with distinguished honors (cum laude) in Chemistry and Physics in 1997.

Inspired by superconductivity and superconducting digital circuits during a summer internship at HYPRES, Inc., he enrolled at Yale University for his doctoral studies. His graduate work focused mainly on aluminum hot-electron bolometers for microwave astronomy. Upon receiving his Ph.D. in 2002, he remained as a postdoctoral fellow at Yale, under Michel Devoret and Rob Schoelkopf, to research high frequency measurement techniques for superconducting qubits.

His post-doctoral work resulted in the development of the Josephson Bifurcation Amplifier, which makes use of the non-dissipative, non-linear nature of the Josephson junction to realize high gain and minimal back action measurements of quantum systems. He joined the University of California, Berkeley as a faculty member in the summer of 2005, and is currently a full professor in the Physics Department. In 2015, his laboratory was awarded the UC Berkeley Award for Excellence in Laboratory Safety, awarded by the Berkeley Office of Environment, Health and Safety.

Siddiqi's research is mainly focused on the fields of quantum electrodynamics and cQED. His current research interests include quantum error correction, multi-partite entanglement generation, quantum simulation of high-correlated condensed matter and high-energy physics theories, and single photon detection.

Siddiqi was one of the five faculty recipients of the "2016 Berkeley Distinguished Teaching Award", which is the University of California, Berkeley's most prestigious honor for teaching. In 2021, Siddiqi was awarded the Joseph F. Keithley Award For Advances in Measurement Science "for fundamental advances in superconducting parametric amplifiers, including the development of the Josephson traveling wave parametric amplifier, and for their application to quantum measurement and control."

As the director of the Advanced Quantum Testbed, Siddiqi and his team are on a mission to develop a digital quantum computer based on superconducting circuits to tackle fundamental science applications relevant to the US Department of Energy. The project aims to collaboratively advance the field by incorporating state-of-the-art quantum hardware into an open-access research tool for the science community.

Siddiqi resides with his family, including two children, in California.

== Honors and awards ==
- Joseph F. Keithley Award For Advances in Measurement Science (2021)
- Rensselaer Polytechnic Institute Medal
- Distinguished Teaching Award, University of California, Berkeley (2016)
- American Physical Society, Division of Condensed Matter Physics, Fellow (2015)
- The DARPA Young Faculty Award (2009)
- The Air Force Office of Scientific Research, Young Investigator Award (2008)
- The UC Berkeley Chancellor's Partnership Faculty Fund (2007)
- The UC Berkeley Hellman Faculty Fund (2007)
- The Office of Naval Research, Young Investigator Award (2007)
- The George E. Valley Prize, American Physical Society (2006)
- The Harding Bliss Prize, Yale University (2002)
- The Harvard Foundation for Intercultural and Race Relations Citation (1997)
- Perkins Prize, Lowell House Harvard University (1997)

== Notable publications ==
- Hashim, A.; Nguyen, L.B.; Marinelli, B.; Naik, R.K.; Chistolini, T.; Hines, J.; Marceaux, J.P.; Kim, Y.; Gokhale, P.; Tomesh, T.; Chen, S.; Jiang, L.; Ferracin, S.; Rudinger, K.; Proctor, T.; Young, K.C.; Siddiqi, I.; Blume-Kohout, R. (15 August 2025). "Practical introduction to benchmarking and characterization of quantum computers". PRX Quantum. 6 (3) 030202. arXiv:2408.12064. Bibcode:2025PRXQu.6..E0302H. doi:10.1103/PRXQuantum.6.030202.
- Nguyen, L.B.; Goss, N.; Siva, K.; Kim, Y.; Younis, E.; Qing, B.C.; Hashim, A.; Santiago, D.I.; Siddiqi, I. (19 August 2024). "Empowering a qudit-based quantum processor by traversing the dual bosonic ladder". Nature Communications. 15 (7117) 7117. arXiv:2312.17741. Bibcode:2024NatCo..15.7117N. doi:10.1038/s41467-024-51434-2. PMID 39160166.
- Nguyen, L.B.; Kim, Y.; Hashim, A.; Goss, N.; Marinelli, B.; Bhandari, B.; Das, D.; Naik, R.K.; Kreikebaum, J.M.; Jordan, A.; Santiago, D.I.; Siddiqi, I. (16 January 2024). "Programmable Heisenberg interactions between Floquet qubits". Nature Physics. 20 (1): 240–246. arXiv:2211.10383. Bibcode:2024NatPh..20..240N. doi:10.1038/s41567-023-02326-7.
- Nguyen, L.B.; Koolstra, G.; Kim, Y.; Morvan, A.; Chistolini, T.; Singh, S.; Nesterov, K.; Jünger, C.; Chen, L.; Pedramrazi, Z.; Mitchell, B.; Kreikebaum, J.M.; Puri, S.; Santiago, D.I.; Siddiqi, I. (5 August 2022). "Blueprint for a high-performance fluxonium quantum processor". PRX Quantum. 3 (3) 037001. arXiv:2201.09374. Bibcode:2022PRXQ....3c7001N. doi:10.1103/PRXQuantum.3.037001.
- Kim, Y.; Morvan, A.; Nguyen, L.B.; Naik, R.K.; Jünger, C.; Chen, L.; Kreikebaum, J.M.; Santiago, D.I.; Siddiqi, I. (2 May 2022). "High-fidelity three-qubit iToffoli gate for fixed-frequency superconducting qubits". Nature Physics. 18 (5): 783–788. arXiv:2108.10288. Bibcode:2022NatPh..18..783K. doi:10.1038/s41567-022-01590-3.
- Flurin, E.; Martin, L. S.; Hacohen-Gourgy, S.; Siddiqi, I. (9 January 2020). "Using a Recurrent Neural Network to Reconstruct Quantum Dynamics of a Superconducting Qubit from Physical Observations". Physical Review X. 10 (1) 011006. arXiv:1811.12420. Bibcode:2020PhRvX..10a1006F. doi:10.1103/PhysRevX.10.011006.
- Colless, J. I.; Ramasesh, V. V.; Dahlen, D.; Blok, M. S.; Kimchi-Schwartz, M. E.; McClean, J. R.; Carter, J.; de Jong, W. A.; Siddiqi, I. (12 February 2018). "Computation of Molecular Spectra on a Quantum Processor with an Error-Resilient Algorithm". Physical Review X. 8 (1) 011021. arXiv:1707.06408. Bibcode:2018PhRvX...8a1021C. doi:10.1103/PhysRevX.8.011021.
- Hacohen-Gourgy, Shay; Martin, Leigh S.; Flurin, Emmanuel; Ramasesh, Vinay V.; Whaley, K. Birgitta; Siddiqi, Irfan (October 2016). "Quantum dynamics of simultaneously measured non-commuting observables". Nature. 538 (7626): 491–494. arXiv:1608.06652. Bibcode:2016Natur.538..491H. doi:10.1038/nature19762. PMID 27706145. S2CID 4446403.
- Macklin, C.; O'Brien, K.; Hover, D.; Schwartz, M. E.; Bolkhovsky, V.; Zhang, X.; Oliver, W. D.; Siddiqi, I. (16 October 2015). "A near–quantum-limited Josephson traveling-wave parametric amplifier". Science. 350 (6258): 307–310. Bibcode:2015Sci...350..307M. doi:10.1126/science.aaa8525. PMID 26338795.
- Weber, S. J.; Chantasri, A.; Dressel, J.; Jordan, A. N.; Murch, K. W.; Siddiqi, I. (July 2014). "Mapping the optimal route between two quantum states". Nature. 511 (7511): 570–573. arXiv:1403.4992. Bibcode:2014Natur.511..570W. doi:10.1038/nature13559. PMID 25079554. S2CID 4406794.
- Murch, K. W.; Weber, S. J.; Macklin, C.; Siddiqi, I. (October 2013). "Observing single quantum trajectories of a superconducting quantum bit". Nature. 502 (7470): 211–214. arXiv:1305.7270. Bibcode:2013Natur.502..211M. doi:10.1038/nature12539. PMID 24108052. S2CID 3648689.
- Murch, K. W.; Weber, S. J.; Beck, K. M.; Ginossar, E.; Siddiqi, I. (July 2013). "Reduction of the radiative decay of atomic coherence in squeezed vacuum". Nature. 499 (7456): 62–65. arXiv:1301.6276. Bibcode:2013Natur.499...62M. doi:10.1038/nature12264. PMID 23823794. S2CID 205234358.
- Vijay, R.; Macklin, C.; Slichter, D. H.; Weber, S. J.; Murch, K. W.; Naik, R.; Korotkov, A. N.; Siddiqi, I. (October 2012). "Stabilizing Rabi oscillations in a superconducting qubit using quantum feedback". Nature. 490 (7418): 77–80. arXiv:1205.5591. Bibcode:2012Natur.490...77V. doi:10.1038/nature11505. PMID 23038468. S2CID 4393126.
- Vijay, R.; Slichter, D. H.; Siddiqi, I. (14 March 2011). "Observation of Quantum Jumps in a Superconducting Artificial Atom". Physical Review Letters. 106 (11) 110502. arXiv:1009.2969. Bibcode:2011PhRvL.106k0502V. doi:10.1103/PhysRevLett.106.110502. PMID 21469850. S2CID 35070320.
- Murch, K. W.; Vijay, R.; Barth, I.; Naaman, O.; Aumentado, J.; Friedland, L.; Siddiqi, I. (February 2011). "Quantum fluctuations in the chirped pendulum". Nature Physics. 7 (2): 105–108. arXiv:1008.4411. Bibcode:2011NatPh...7..105M. doi:10.1038/nphys1867. S2CID 59330394.
- Siddiqi, I.; Clarke, J. (8 September 2006). "Entangled Solid-State Circuits". Science. 313 (5792): 1400–1401. doi:10.1126/science.1132544. OSTI 910595. PMID 16959997. S2CID 30804337.
- Siddiqi, I.; Vijay, R.; Metcalfe, M.; Boaknin, E.; Frunzio, L.; Schoelkopf, R. J.; Devoret, M. H. (23 February 2006). "Dispersive measurements of superconducting qubit coherence with a fast latching readout". Physical Review B. 73 (5) 054510. arXiv:cond-mat/0507548. Bibcode:2006PhRvB..73e4510S. doi:10.1103/physrevb.73.054510. S2CID 7720491.
- Siddiqi, I.; Vijay, R.; Pierre, F.; Wilson, C. M.; Metcalfe, M.; Rigetti, C.; Frunzio, L.; Devoret, M. H. (10 November 2004). "RF-Driven Josephson Bifurcation Amplifier for Quantum Measurement". Physical Review Letters. 93 (20) 207002. arXiv:cond-mat/0312623. Bibcode:2004PhRvL..93t7002S. doi:10.1103/physrevlett.93.207002. PMID 15600958. S2CID 26805185.
- Siddiqi, I.; Vijay, R.; Pierre, F.; Wilson, C. M.; Frunzio, L.; Metcalfe, M.; Rigetti, C.; Schoelkopf, R. J.; Devoret, M. H.; Vion, D.; Esteve, D. (20 January 2005). "Direct Observation of Dynamical Bifurcation between Two Driven Oscillation States of a Josephson Junction". Physical Review Letters. 94 (2) 027005. arXiv:cond-mat/0312553. Bibcode:2005PhRvL..94b7005S. doi:10.1103/physrevlett.94.027005. PMID 15698220.
- Bergeal, N.; Vijay, R.; Manucharyan, V. E.; Siddiqi, I.; Schoelkopf, R. J.; Girvin, S. M.; Devoret, M. H. (14 February 2010). "Analog information processing at the quantum limit with a Josephson ring modulator". Nature Physics. 6 (4): 296–302. arXiv:0805.3452. Bibcode:2010NatPh...6..296B. doi:10.1038/nphys1516. S2CID 20148276.
- Metcalfe, M.; Boaknin, E.; Manucharyan, V.; Vijay, R.; Siddiqi, I.; Rigetti, C.; Frunzio, L.; Schoelkopf, R. J.; Devoret, M. H. (21 November 2007). "Measuring the decoherence of a quantronium qubit with the cavity bifurcation amplifier". Physical Review B. 76 (17) 174516. arXiv:0706.0765. Bibcode:2007PhRvB..76q4516M. doi:10.1103/physrevb.76.174516. S2CID 19088840.
