= Joseph F. Keithley Award =

Joseph F. Keithley Award For Advances in Measurement Science
- Awarded for: Outstanding contributions in measurement techniques or equipment
- First award: 1998
- Website: Joseph F. Keithley Award For Advances in Measurement Science

The Joseph F. Keithley Award For Advances in Measurement Science is an award of the American Physical Society (APS) that was first awarded in 1998. It is named in honor of Joseph F. Keithley, the founder of Keithley Instruments. The award is presented annually for outstanding contributions in measurement techniques and equipment, and is sponsored by Keithley Instruments and the Topical Group on Instrument and Measurement Science (GIMS).

The award is not to be confused with the similarly named IEEE Joseph F. Keithley Award in Instrumentation and Measurement of the Institute of Electrical and Electronics Engineers (IEEE), which is also endowed by Keithley Instruments.

== Recipients ==
The award has been given to the following people.

- 1998: John Clarke
- 1999: Simon Foner
- 2000: Calvin Forrest Quate, H. Kumar Wickramasinghe
- 2001: James E. Faller
- 2002: Robert J. Soulen Jr.
- 2003: Arthur Ashkin
- 2004: Virgil Bruce Elings
- 2005: E. Dwight Adams
- 2006: Frances Hellman
- 2007: Kent D. Irwin
- 2008: Bjorn Wannberg
- 2009: Robert J. Schoelkopf
- 2010: Eugene Ivanov
- 2011: Ian Walmsley
- 2012: Andreas Mandelis
- 2013: David McClelland, Nergis Mavalvala, Roman Schnabel
- 2014: Franz Josef Giessibl
- 2015: Daniel T. Pierce, John Unguris, Robert J. Celotta
- 2016: Albert Migliori
- 2017: Peter Denes
- 2018: Andreas J. Heinrich, Joseph A. Stroscio, Wilson Ho
- 2019: Zahid Hussain
- 2020: No award given.
- 2021: Irfan Siddiqi
- 2022: Daniel Rugar and John Mamin
- 2023: Joel N. Ullom
- 2024: David A Muller
- 2025: Frances M. Ross
- 2026: Jianwei (John) Miao

== See also ==
- List of physics awards
