= Bell Medal =

Bell Medal may refer to:

- IEEE Alexander Graham Bell Medal, awarded by the Institute of Electrical and Electronics Engineers
- Alexander Graham Bell Medal, awarded by the National Geographic Society
- Gertrude Bell Memorial Gold Medal, awarded by the British Institute for the Study of Iraq
- John Stewart Bell Prize, awarded by the Centre for Quantum Information and Quantum Control of the University of Toronto.
