= K. Alex Müller =

Swiss physicist (1927–2023)

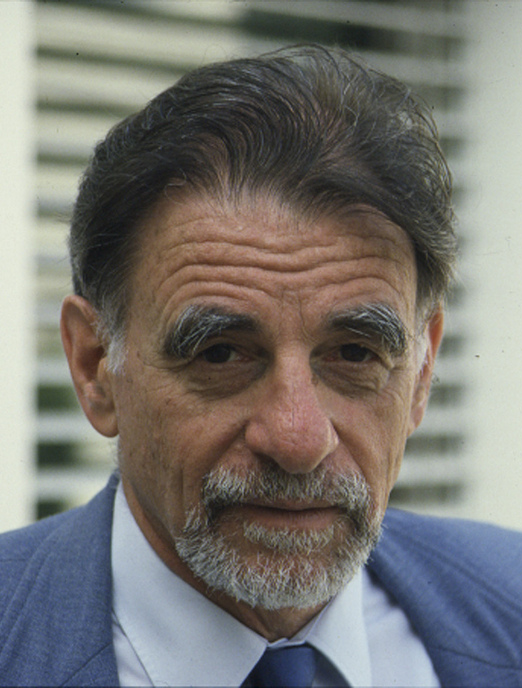
- Müller in the 1980s
- Born: Karl Alexander Müller; 20 April 1927; Basel, Switzerland
- Died: 9 January 2023 (aged 95); Zurich, Switzerland
- Education: ETH Zurich (grad. 1952, 1958)
- Known for: Discovery of high-temperature superconductivity
- Spouse: Ingeborg Marie Louise Winkler (m. 1956)
- Children: 2
- Awards: Marcel Benoist Prize (1986); Nobel Prize in Physics (1987); Wilhelm Exner Medal (1987); Fritz London Memorial Prize (1987); Dannie Heineman Prize (1987); International Prize for New Materials (1988); EPS Europhysics Prize (1988)
- Scientific career
- Fields: Physics
- Workplaces: Battelle Memorial Institute; University of Zurich; IBM Zurich Research Laboratory
- Thesis: Paramagnetische Resonanz von Fe^{3+} in SrTiO_{3} Einkristallen (1958)
- Doctoral advisor: Georg Busch
- Doctoral students: Georg Bednorz

Karl Alexander Müller (20 April 1927 – 9 January 2023) was a Swiss physicist. He received the Nobel Prize in Physics in 1987 with Georg Bednorz for their discovery of superconductivity in ceramic materials.

== Early life and education ==
Karl Alexander Müller was born on 20 April 1927 in Basel, Switzerland, the son of Paul Rudolf Müller and Irma Feigenbaum. His mother was Jewish. His family immediately moved to Salzburg, Austria, where his father was studying music. Alex and his mother then moved to Dornach, the home of his maternal grandparents. Then they moved to Lugano, in the Italian-speaking part of Switzerland, where he learned to speak Italian fluently. His mother died when he was 11.

Müller was sent to school at the Evangelical College in Schiers, in the eastern part of Switzerland. Here he studied from 1938 to 1945, obtaining his baccalaureate (Matura). He then enrolled in the Physics and Mathematics Department of ETH Zurich. He took courses by Wolfgang Pauli, who made a deep impression on him. After receiving his Diplom in 1952, he worked for one year, then returned to ETH Zurich for a Ph.D., submitting his thesis at the end of 1957.

== Career ==
After graduating in 1958, Müller joined the Battelle Memorial Institute as the manager of a magnetic resonance group. During this time, he became a lecturer at the University of Zürich. In 1963, he accepted an offer as a research staff member at the IBM Zurich Research Laboratory in Rüschlikon, where he remained until his retirement. In parallel, he maintained his affiliation with the University of Zurich, where he was appointed a professor in 1970. He became an IBM Fellow in 1982.

== Research ==
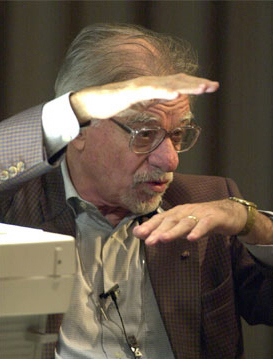
Müller in 2002

For his undergraduate diploma work, Müller studied under G. Busch. He worked on the Hall Effect in gray tin, a semimetal.

Between his undergraduate degree and beginning his graduate studies, he worked for one year in the Department of Industrial Research at ETH on the Eidophor large-scale display system.

At IBM his research for almost 15 years centered on SrTiO_{3} (strontium titanate) and related perovskite compounds. He studied their photochromic properties when doped with various transition-metal ions; their chemical binding, ferroelectric and soft-mode properties; and the critical and multicritical phenomena of their structural phase transitions. Important highlights of this research have been published in a book written together with Tom Kool from the University of Amsterdam (publisher: World Scientific).

== Personal life and death ==
In the spring of 1956, Müller married Ingeborg Marie Louise Winkler. They had a son, Eric, in the summer of 1957, and a daughter, Sylvia, in 1960.

Müller died on 9 January 2023 in Zurich at the age of 95.

== Nobel Prize-winning work ==
In the early 1980s, Müller began searching for substances that would become superconductive at higher temperatures. The highest critical temperature (T_{c}) attainable at that time was about 23 K. In 1983 Müller recruited Georg Bednorz to IBM, to help systematically test various oxides. A few recent studies had indicated these materials might superconduct, but experts who knew about Müller's idea thought it was “crazy”. In 1986 the two researchers succeeded in achieving superconductivity in lanthanum barium copper oxide (LBCO) at a temperature of 35 K. Over the previous 75 years the critical temperature had risen from 11 K in 1911 to 23 K in 1973 where it had remained for 13 years. Thus 35 K was incredibly high by the prevailing standards of superconductivity research. This discovery stimulated a great deal of additional research in high-temperature superconductivity, leading to the discovery of compounds such as BSCCO (T_{c} = 107 K) and YBCO (T'_{c} = 92 K).

They reported their discovery in the June 1986 issue of Zeitschrift für Physik B. Before the end of the year, Shoji Tanaka at the University of Tokyo and then Paul Chu at the University of Houston had each independently confirmed their result. A couple of months later Chu achieved superconductivity at 93 K in YBCO, triggering a stampede of scientific interest exemplified by the 1987 "Woodstock of physics", at which Müller was a featured presenter.

In 1987, Müller and Bednorz were jointly awarded the Nobel Prize in physics—the shortest time between the discovery and the prize award for any scientific Nobel.

== Recognition ==
=== Awards ===
Year	Organization	Award	Citation	Ref.
1986	(Switzerland) Marcel Benoist Foundation	Marcel Benoist Prize (Note: Shared with Georg Bednorz.)	—	
1987	(Sweden) Royal Swedish Academy of Sciences	Nobel Prize in Physics	"For their important break-through in the discovery of superconductivity in ceramic materials."	
1987	(Austria) Austrian Trade Association	Wilhelm Exner Medal	—	
1987	(United States) Duke University	Fritz London Memorial Prize (Note: Shared with Georg Bednorz, John Clarke, and Jun Kondō.)	"For their pioneering work in the field of high T_{c} oxide superconductors. Their discovery of superconductivity in the barium lanthanum copper oxides has sparked a worldwide research effort which is making superconductivity a commercially important technology."	
1987	(West Germany) Göttingen Academy of Sciences and Humanities	Dannie Heineman Prize	"For their research in physics."	
1988	(United States) American Physical Society	International Prize for New Materials (Note: Shared with Georg Bednorz and Paul Ching Wu Chu.)	"For discoveries of superconducting oxide materials with high transition temperatures."	
1988	(Switzerland) European Physical Society	EPS Europhysics Prize	"For the discovery of high-temperature superconductivity."	

=== Honorary degrees ===
Year	University	Degree	Ref.
1987	(Italy) University of Pavia	—	
1988	(Belgium) KU Leuven	—	
1988	(United States) Boston University	Doctor of Science	
1988	(West Germany) Technische Universität Darmstadt	—	
1992	(Norway) Norwegian Institute of Technology	Doctor of Technology	

=== Memberships ===
Year	Organization	Type	Ref.
1989	(United States) National Academy of Sciences	International Member	
1991	(Switzerland) Swiss Physical Society	Honorary Member	

== See also ==
- Timeline of low-temperature technology
