= International Conference on Low Temperature Physics =

Academic conference

The International Conference on Low Temperature Physics (LT) is an academic conference held every three years near the month of September attracting on average well over a thousand participants from all over the world. The LT conferences are endorsed by the International Union of Pure and Applied Physics (IUPAP) via its Commission on Low Temperature Physics (C5). The mandate of the LT conferences is to promote the exchange of information and views among the members of the international scientific community in the general field of Low Temperature Physics.

Usually, several other satellite meetings are also held just before or after the LT conferences in neighboring cities such as the International Conference on Ultra Low Temperature Physics series (ULT) as well as other meetings related to the topics listed below. Starting from 1998, the Symposium on Quantum Fluids and Solids (QFT) conference series was decided to be held in all non-LT years.

== Topics ==
The general field of low temperature physics is broad, but usually the LT conferences are divided into five parallel programs:

- A. Quantum Gases, Fluids and Solids
- B. Superconductivity
- C. Quantum Phase Transitions and Magnetism
- D. Electronic Quantum Transport in Condensed Matter
- E. Cryogenic Techniques and Applications

== Editions ==
The conferences are typically held in the following pattern: Europe > Asia > The Americas > Europe. The LT29 Conference was originally planned to be held in 2020, but was postponed two years due to COVID-19.

International Low Temperature Physics Conferences
LT	Location	Year
0	Cambridge, England	1946
1	Cambridge, Massachusetts	1949
2	Oxford	1951
3	Houston	1953
4	Paris	1955
5	Madison, Wisconsin	1957
6	Leiden	1958
7	Toronto	1960
8	London	1962
9	Columbus, Ohio	1964
10	Moscow	1966
11	St. Andrews	1968
12	Kyoto	1970
13	Boulder, Colorado	1972
14	Otaniemi	1975
15	Grenoble	1978
16	Los Angeles	1981
17	Karlsruhe	1984
18	Kyoto	1987
19	Brighton	1990
20	Eugene, Oregon	1993
21	Prague	1996
22	Otaniemi	1999
23	Hiroshima	2002
24	Orlando	2005
25	Amsterdam	2008
26	Beijing	2011
27	Buenos Aires	2014
28	Gothenburg	2017
29	Sapporo	2022
30	Bilbao	2025

== Prizes ==
The Fritz London Memorial Prize was created to recognize scientists who made outstanding contributions to the advances of the field of Low Temperature Physics. It is traditionally awarded in the opening session of the LT meeting. The prize is named in honor of Fritz London.

Other prizes awarded in the LT meeting are the Simon Memorial Prize and the IUPAP Young Scientist Prizes in Low Temperature Physics (since LT-25). The Olli V. Lounasmaa Memorial Prize, established in 2004, is awarded at the LT meeting starting from 2025.

Recipients of the Fritz London Memorial Prize
Year	Recipient	Citation
1957	Nicholas Kurti	"for distinguished research in low temperature physics and chemistry"
1960	Lev D. Landau	"for his outstanding theoretical contributions in low temperature physics"
1962	John Bardeen	"for distinguished research in low temperature physics, for his development with Leon N. Cooper and J. R. Schrieffer, of the first successful microscopic theory of superconductivity"
1964	David Shoenberg	"for outstanding accomplishment in the field of low temperature physics."
1966	Cornelis J. Gorter	"for his contributions to the growth and development of magnetic resonance in electronic and nuclear systems and to the education and research work in low temperature physics."
1968	William M. Fairbank	"for his very precise measurement of the specific heat of ^{4}He at the lambda point, of the nuclear susceptibility of liquid ^{3}He, the discovery of the phase separation in ^{3}He-^{4}He mixtures and of the flux quantization in superconductors."
1970	Brian Josephson	"for predicting effects that have provided concrete examples of macroscopic quantum phenomena."
1972	Alexei Abrikosov	"for his theoretical work in low temperature physics, especially the discovery of type-II superconductivity, and for his work on the theory of superconducting alloys, especially the concept of gapless superconductivity, the theory of Fermi liquids, the application of field-theoretic methods in statistical physics and contributions to the theory of dilute magnetic alloys."
1975	John Wheatley	"[for] many achievements in advancing the physics of millikelvin temperatures, including his development of improved dilution and Pomeranchuk refrigerators, as well as his fundamental research elucidating the Fermi liquid properties of liquid ^{3}He, the properties of ^{3}He-^{4}He mixtures, and the recently discovered superfluid phases of ^{3}He."
1978	Guenter Ahlers	"for contributions to the fundamental knowledge of critical phenomena (especially his highly innovative and extremely accurate work on helium and on magnetic solids at low temperatures) and of the onset of hydrodynamic instabilities."
1978	William L. McMillan	"for theoretical contributions to the fundamental knowledge of superconductivity, particularly his analysis of electron tunneling data to determine the interactions of electrons and phonons in metals and their relationship to their superconducting transition temperature"
1978	John M. Rowell	"for experimental contributions to the fundamental knowledge of superconductivity, particularly his electron tunneling measurements of the interaction of electrons and phonons in metals, and for his experimental discovery of the Josephson effect"
1981	John Reppy	"for experimental contributions to our fundamental knowledge in liquid ^{3}He and ^{4}He. His elegant techniques of high precision with the superfluid gyroscope and torsional oscillator have led to major discoveries and clarifications of superfluid helium in bulk form, in films and in mixtures, specially at phase transitions."
1981	Anthony J. Leggett	"for theoretical contributions to our fundamental understanding of normal and superfluid Fermi liquids. His theory of magnetic resonance in the superfluid phases of ^{3}He provided the key to deciphering their mysteries and an invaluable guide in their subsequent exploration."
1981	Isidor Rudnick	"for experimental contributions to our fundamental knowledge in bulk liquid helium and in helium films by means of a wide range of highly sophisticated acoustic techniques that were particularly important for understanding the superfluid phase transition of ^{4}He in two and three dimensions, the superfluid critical velocities and the persistent currents."
1984	Werner Buckel	"for pioneering application of low temperatures to prepare new, amorphous phases of metals, and for his study of the superconducting properties of metals modified by disorder, ion implantation and high pressure."
1984	Olli Lounasmaa	"in recognition of his systematic development of cooling techniques that combine dilution refrigeration with nuclear demagnetization, and for their application to the production of nuclear ordered metallic copper and to the discovery of new properties of superfluid ^{3}He."
1984	David J. Thouless	"[for] elucidation of the subtle effects of fluctuations and disorder on low temperature systems, including his theories of phase transitions in two dimensions and of electron localization and magnetism in disordered materials."
1987	K. Alex Müller	"for their pioneering work in the field of high-T_{c} oxide superconductors. Their discovery of superconductivity in the barium lanthanum copper oxides has sparked a worldwide research effort which is making superconductivity a commercially important technology."
1987	Johannes Georg Bednorz	"for their pioneering work in the field of high-T_{c} oxide superconductors. Their discovery of superconductivity in the barium lanthanum copper oxides has sparked a worldwide research effort which is making superconductivity a commercially important technology."
1987	Jun Kondo	"for his explanation of the phenomenon of the resistance minimum in metallic systems with magnetic impurities, revealing a subtlety in the behavior of interacting Fermi systems not suspected previously."
1987	John Clarke	"for his contributions to the understanding of low temperature quantum phenomena through the creation, development and application of instrumentation based on quantum properties of superconductors."
1990	Robert C. Dynes	"for his broad contributions to low temperature physics, including tunneling studies and theoretical analyses of strong coupling superconductors, the creative use of tunnel junctions to measure quasiparticle lifetime effects in superconductors and to study phonon propagation in solids and liquid helium, and the observation of weak localization in two-dimensional systems."
1990	Pierre C. Hohenberg	"For his seminal theoretical contributions to the physics of superfluidity, of critical phenomena, and of instability in pattern-forming hydrodynamic systems, as well as for his strong positive influence on the direction and interpretation of experimental research in these fields."
1990	Anatoly Larkin	"for his important contributions to the theory of thermal and quantum fluctuations at low temperatures, including his work on fluctuations in superconductors, on flux-lattice and charge pinning, on weak localization, and on quantum tunneling, as well as his work on phase transitions in dipolar systems, which pioneered the use of the renormalization group for calculation of critical exponents."
1993	Albert Schmid	"for his many contributions to theoretical low temperature physics, in particular his studies of non-equilibrium superconductivity, of the effects of disorder in metals and of the quantum mechanics of dissipative systems."
1993	Dennis Greywall	"for his studies of the helium isotopes at very low temperatures, including his work on sound propagation in single crystals of solid helium, his determination of the millikelvin temperature scale and his pioneering work on two-dimensional ^{3}He and ^{4}He."
1993	Horst Meyer	"for his experimental investigations of phenomena in quantum liquids and solids, in particular for his research on quantum diffusion and orientational ordering in solid hydrogen and for his comprehensive and pioneering work on the critical properties of helium mixtures."
1996	Moses H. W. Chan	"for his experimental studies of phase transitions in fluids, especially in reduced dimensions, restricted geometries and in presence of disorder and impurities; as well as for his contributions to the experimental study of wetting."
1996	Carl Wieman	"for his successful efforts to get trapped atoms to high enough densities and low enough temperatures to demonstrate Bose-Einstein condensation of weakly interacting atoms."
1996	Eric A. Cornell	"For his method of getting trapped rubidium atoms to high enough densities and low enough temperatures to demonstrate Bose-Einstein condensation of weakly interacting atoms."
1999	Douglas F. Brewer	"for his experimental discoveries in adsorbed helium films, including the reduced transition temperatures and T^{2} specific heat; and for his finding of the linear temperature dependence of the specific heat of ^{3}He; the surface-enhanced nuclear susceptibility of liquid ^{3}He and his verification of the minimum in the ^{3}He melting curve."
1999	Matti Krusius	"for pioneering use of rotation combined with nuclear magnetic resonance to study various properties of superfluid ^{3}He, including textures of the order parameter, the structure, pinning and collective behavior of several different types of vortex, the critical velocity under rotation, the effects of motion of the A-B interface and the systematics of nucleation of vorticity by neutron irradiation."
1999	Wolfgang Ketterle	"for his development of techniques needed to study Bose-Einstein condensation in dilute alkali gases, including the clover-leaf Ioffe-Pritchard trap, rf evaporation, optical trapping and non-destructive interrogation using phase contrast and dark-field imaging; and for his pioneering investigations of these systems."
2002	Russell J. Donnelly	"for his contribution to low temperature fluid dynamics, in particular for his work on superfluid turbulence and for his use of critical helium gas in the study of thermal convection at record high Rayleigh numbers."
2002	Walter N. Hardy	"for his contributions in many areas of low temperature physics, particularly in the elucidation of the d-wave pairing state of the high T_{c} superconductor YBCO.
2002	Allen M. Goldman	"for his contributions to the physics of superconductors, particularly the discovery of gapless collective modes, and for his inventive work on superconductor-insulator transitions in ultrathin films."
2005	Sébastien Balibar	"for his work on the surfaces of helium crystals, especially their roughening transitions, their quantum dynamics, and their instability under stress, for his study of cavitation in liquid helium at negative pressure using high amplitude acoustic waves and for his early experiments on quantum evaporation of superfluid ^{4}He."
2005	J.C. Séamus Davis	"for studies of superfluid ^{3}He weak link arrays revealing a rich variety of phenomena including quantum interference and for the invention and development of spectroscopic imaging STM techniques and their application in studies of individual impurity/dopant atom effects, vortex-core electronic structure, quasiparticle interference effects and alternative ordered states in the cuprate superconductors."
2005	Richard Packard	"for studies in superfluid helium of important macroscopic quantum effects on the single quantum level including the detection of single quantized vortex lines, the photography of quantized vortices and the proof of quantization of circulation in 3He, and for his development of weak link arrays in both 3He and 4He and the discoveries of a rich variety of related phenomena including quantum interference."
2008	Yuriy M. Bunkov	"for the discovery and understanding of unique phenomena in superfluid ^{3}He-B: macroscopic phase-coherent spin precession and the flow of spin supercurrent."
2008	Vladimir V. Dmitriev	"for the discovery and understanding of unique phenomena in superfluid ^{3}He-B: macroscopic phase-coherent spin precession and the flow of spin supercurrent."
2008	Igor A. Fomin	"for the discovery and understanding of unique phenomena in superfluid ^{3}He-B: macroscopic phase-coherent spin precession and the flow of spin supercurrent."
2011	Humphrey Maris	"for his original theories and experimental discoveries in liquid helium, concerning phonons, Kapitza resistance, levitation, nucleation, electron bubbles and vortex imaging."
2011	Hans Mooij	"for his experimental contributions to the understanding of nonequilibrium superconductivity, the properties of superconducting films and junction arrays, Josephson flux qubits, and electron quantum transport in these systems."
2011	Gerd Schön	"for theoretical contributions to the understanding of superconductivity in mesoscopic systems, including work on dissipative quantum mechanics of junctions and the proposal of the superconducting charge qubit"
2014	Michel Devoret	"for fundamental and pioneering experimental advances in quantum control, quantum information processing and quantum optics with superconducting qubits and microwave photons"
2014	John M. Martinis	"for fundamental and pioneering experimental advances in quantum control, quantum information processing and quantum optics with superconducting qubits and microwave photons"
2014	Robert J. Schoelkopf	"for fundamental and pioneering experimental advances in quantum control, quantum information processing and quantum optics with superconducting qubits and microwave photons"
2017	William Halperin	"for pioneering work on the influence of disorder on the superfluidity of Helium-3"
2017	Jeevak Parpia	"for pioneering work on the influence of disorder on the superfluidity of Helium-3"
2017	James Sauls	"for pioneering work on the influence of disorder on the superfluidity of Helium-3"
2020	Frank Steglich	"for discovery and exploration of the unconventional superconductivity in heavy fermion metals"
2020	Valerii Vinokur	"for pioneering work on the theoretical investigation of superconductivity in disordered materials and type-II superconductivity"
2020	Qi-Kun Xue	"for pioneering work on the experimental discovery of quantum anomalous Hall effect and edge channel in magnetic topological insulators."
2025	Robert Hallock	“For his many innovative achievements in the physics of liquid helium films and his pioneering work on supertransport in solid helium-4, which includes the paradigm-changing discovery of giant isochoric compressibility.”
2025	John Saunders	“In recognition of his pioneering research on topological and strongly correlated quantum fluids and solids in reduced dimensions, enabled by his development of cryogenic and measurement technology to open research opportunities spanning quantum materials to fundamental physics.”
2025	Ali Yazdani	“For cutting-edge discoveries of the interplay between correlated phases and superconductivity in cuprates, heavy fermion systems, and graphene using advanced low-temperature scanning tunneling microscopy.”
