= Picosecond ultrasonics =

Non-destructive type of ultrasonics

Picosecond ultrasonics is a type of ultrasonics that uses ultra-high frequency ultrasound generated by ultrashort light pulses. It is a non-destructive technique in which picosecond acoustic pulses penetrate into thin films or nanostructures to reveal internal features such as film thickness as well as cracks, delaminations and voids. It can also be used to probe liquids. The technique is also referred to as picosecond laser ultrasonics or laser picosecond acoustics. The method relies on an optical pump pulse to generate a local thermal stress that launches the strain pulse, which is then detected as a series of echoes upon returning to the surface.

== Introduction ==
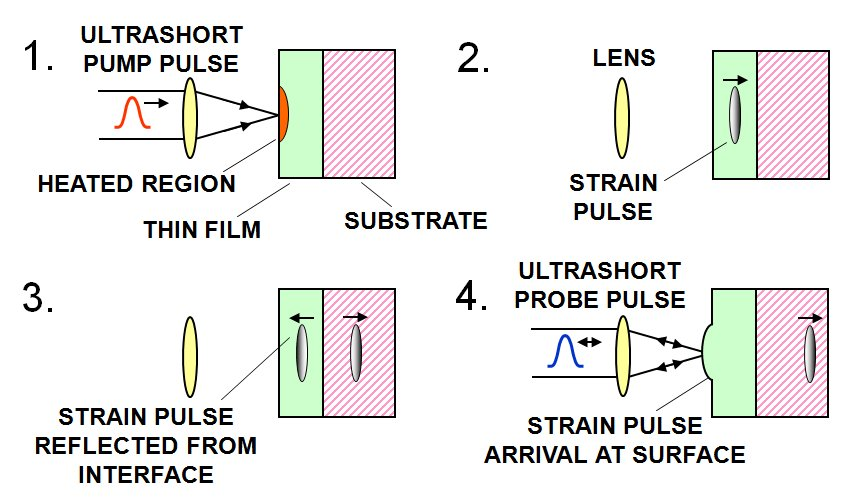
Generation and detection of picosecond strain pulses in an opaque thin film with ultrashort optical pulses. In this example, the optical probe pulse arrives at the film surface at the same time as the returning strain pulse. In general, measurements are made by varying the arrival time of the optical probe pulse. The thermal expansion of the surface is omitted. For example, in the case of an aluminum film, the strain pulse will have a typical frequency and bandwidth both ~ 100 GHz, a duration of ~ 10 ps, a wavelength of ~100 nm, and a strain amplitude of ~ 10^{−4} when using optical pulses of duration ~ 100 fs and energy ~ 1 nJ focused to a ~ 50 μm spot on the sample surface.

When an ultrashort light pulse, known as the pump pulse, is focused onto a thin opaque film on a substrate, the optical absorption results in a thermal expansion that launches an elastic strain pulse. This strain pulse mainly consists of longitudinal acoustic phonons that propagate directly into the film as a coherent pulse.

After acoustic reflection from the film-substrate interface, the strain pulse returns to the film surface, where it can be detected by a delayed optical probe pulse through optical reflectance or (for films that are thin enough) transmittance changes. This time-resolved method for generation and photoelastic detection of coherent picosecond acoustic phonon pulses was proposed by Christian Thomsen and coworkers in a collaboration between Brown University and Bell Laboratories in 1984.

Initial development took place in Humphrey Maris's group at Brown University and elsewhere in the late 1980s. In the early 1990s the method was extended in scope at Nippon Steel Corp. by direct sensing of the picosecond surface vibrations of the film caused by the returning strain pulses, resulting in improved detection sensitivity in many cases. Advances after the year 2000 include the generation of picosecond acoustic solitons by the use of millimeter propagation distances and the generation of picosecond shear waves by the use of anisotropic materials or small (~1 μm) optical spot sizes. Acoustic frequencies up to the terahertz range in solids and up to ~ 10 GHz in liquids have been reported.

Apart from thermal expansion, generation through the deformation potential or through piezoelectricity is possible. Picosecond ultrasonics is currently used as a thin film metrology technique for probing films of sub-micrometer thicknesses with nanometer resolution in-depth, that sees widespread use in the semiconductor processing industry. The picosecond ultrasonics has also been applied to measure the acoustic velocity inside nanomaterials or to study phonon physics.

== Generation and detection ==
=== Generation ===
The absorption of an incident optical pump pulse sets up a local thermal stress near the surface of the sample. This stress launches an elastic strain pulse that propagates into the sample. The exact depth for the stress generation depends, in particular, on the material involved and the optical pump wavelength. In metals and semiconductors, for example, ultrashort-timescale thermal and carrier diffusion tends to increase the depth that is initially heated within the first ~1 ps.

Acoustic pulses are generated with a temporal duration approximately equal to the acoustic transit time across this initially heated depth, in general greater than the optical absorption depth. For example, the optical absorption depths in Al and GaAs are ~10 nm for blue light, but the electron diffusion depths are ~50 and 100 nm, respectively. The diffusion depth determines the spatial extent of the strain pulse in the through-thickness direction.

The main generation mechanism for metals is thermal expansion, whereas for semiconductors it is often the deformation potential mechanism. In piezoelectric materials the inverse piezoelectric effect, arising from the production of internal electric fields induced by charge separation, may dominate.

When the optical spot diameter D, for example D~10 μm, at the surface of an elastically isotropic and flat sample is much greater than the initially heated depth, one can approximate the acoustic field propagating into the solid by a one-dimensional problem, provided that one does not work with strain propagation depths that are too large (~D²/Λ=Rayleigh length, where Λ is the acoustic wavelength). In this configuration—the one originally proposed for picosecond ultrasonics—only longitudinal acoustic strain pulses need to be considered. The strain pulse forms a pancake-like region of longitudinal strain that propagates directly into the solid away from the surface.

For small spot sizes approaching the optical diffraction limit, for example D~1 μm, it may be necessary to consider the three-dimensional nature of the problem. In this case acoustic mode-conversion at surfaces and interfaces and acoustic diffraction play an important role, resulting in the involvement of both shear and longitudinal polarizations. The strain pulse separates into different polarization components and spreads out laterally (for distances >D²/Λ) as it propagates down into the sample, resulting in a more complicated, three-dimensional strain distribution.

The use of both shear and longitudinal pulses is advantageous for measuring elastic constants or sound velocities. Shear waves may also be generated by the use of elastically anisotropic solids cut at oblique angles to the crystal axes. This allows shear or quasi-shear waves to be generated with a large amplitude in the through-thickness direction.

It is also possible to generate strain pulses whose shape does not vary on propagation. These so-called acoustic solitons have been demonstrated at low temperatures over propagation distances of a few millimeters. They result from a delicate balance between acoustic dispersion and nonlinear effects.

=== Detection ===
Strain pulses returning to the surface from buried interfaces or other sub-surface acoustically inhomogeneous regions are detected as a series of echoes. For example, strain pulses propagating back and forth through a thin film produce a decaying series of echoes, from which one may derive, in particular, the film thickness, the ultrasonic attenuation or the ultrasonic dispersion.

The original detection mechanism used in picosecond ultrasonics is based on the photoelastic effect. The refractive index and extinction coefficient near the surface of the solid are perturbed by the returning strain pulses (within the optical absorption depth of the probe light), resulting in changes in the optical reflectance or transmission. The measured temporal echo shape results from a spatial integral involving both the probe light optical absorption profile and the strain pulse spatial profile (see below).

Detection involving the surface displacement is also possible if the optical phase is recorded. In this case the echo shape when measured through the optical phase variation is proportional to a spatial integral of the strain distribution (see below). Surface displacement detection has been demonstrated with ultrafast optical beam deflection and with interferometry.

For a homogeneous isotropic sample in vacuum with normal optical incidence, the optical amplitude reflectance (r) modulation can be expressed as

$$\frac {\delta r}{r} = \frac{4ik\tilde n}{1-{\tilde n}^2}\frac{d\tilde n}{d\eta}\int_{0}^{\infty} \eta(z,t)e^{2i\tilde nkz}dz+2iku(t)$$

where $\tilde n =n+i\kappa$ (n the refractive index and κ the extinction coefficient) is the complex refractive index for the probe light in the sample, k is the wave number of the probe light in vacuum, η(z, t) is the spatiotemporal longitudinal strain variation, $d\tilde n/d\eta$ is the photoelastic constant, z is the depth in the sample, t is the time and u is the surface displacement of the sample (in the +z direction):

$u(t)= -\int_{0}^{\infty} \eta(z,t)dz$

To obtain the variation in optical reflectivity for intensity R one uses $\delta R/R=2\rm{Re}(\it{\delta r/r})$, whereas to obtain the variation in optical phase one uses $\delta \it{\phi}=\rm{Im}(\it{\delta r/r})$.

The theory of optical detection in multilayer samples, including both interface motion and the photoelastic effect, is now well-developed. The control of the polarization state and angle of incidence of the probe light has been shown to be useful for detecting shear acoustic waves.

== Applications and future challenges ==
Picosecond ultrasonics has been applied successfully to analyze a variety of materials, both solid and liquid. It is increasingly being applied to nanostructures, including sub-micrometre films, multilayers, quantum wells, semiconductor heterostructures and nano-cavities. It is also applied to probe the mechanical properties of a single biological cell.

== See also ==
- Photoacoustic imaging
- Acoustics
- Ultrasound
- Phonons
- Soliton
- Waves
- Light
- Time-resolved spectroscopy
- Stress
- Strain
- Photoelasticity
- Anisotropy
