= William L. McMillan =

American physicist (1936–1984)

William L. McMillan (January 13, 1936 – August 30, 1984) was an American physicist noted for his research of condensed matter physics. McMillan was a member of the National Academy of Sciences, professor of physics at University of Illinois, Urbana-Champaign. He was also a member of the American Academy of Arts and Sciences McMillan received the 1978 Fritz London Memorial Prize for his work in superconductors. The National Academies Press called him "the ablest condensed matter physicist of his generation". The University of Illinois established an award in his name: The William L. McMillan Award.

The electron-phonon coupling in superconductors is described by the McMillan parameter.

== Life and career ==
- 1936 born in Little Rock, Arkansas
- 1958: BS, University of Arkansas (Electrical Engineering)
- 1959: MS, University of Arkansas (Physics)
- 1964: PhD, University of Illinois, Urbana-Champaign
- 1964–1972: Bell Laboratories, Member, Technical Staff
- 1972–1984: University of Illinois, Urbana-Champaign, Professor of Physics
- 1978 Fritz London Memorial Prize for his work on superconductors
- 1982: elected to National Academy of Sciences
- 1983: elected to the American Academy of Arts and Sciences in 1983
- 1984: Died of an accident at age 48
