= John M. Martinis =

American physicist (born 1958)

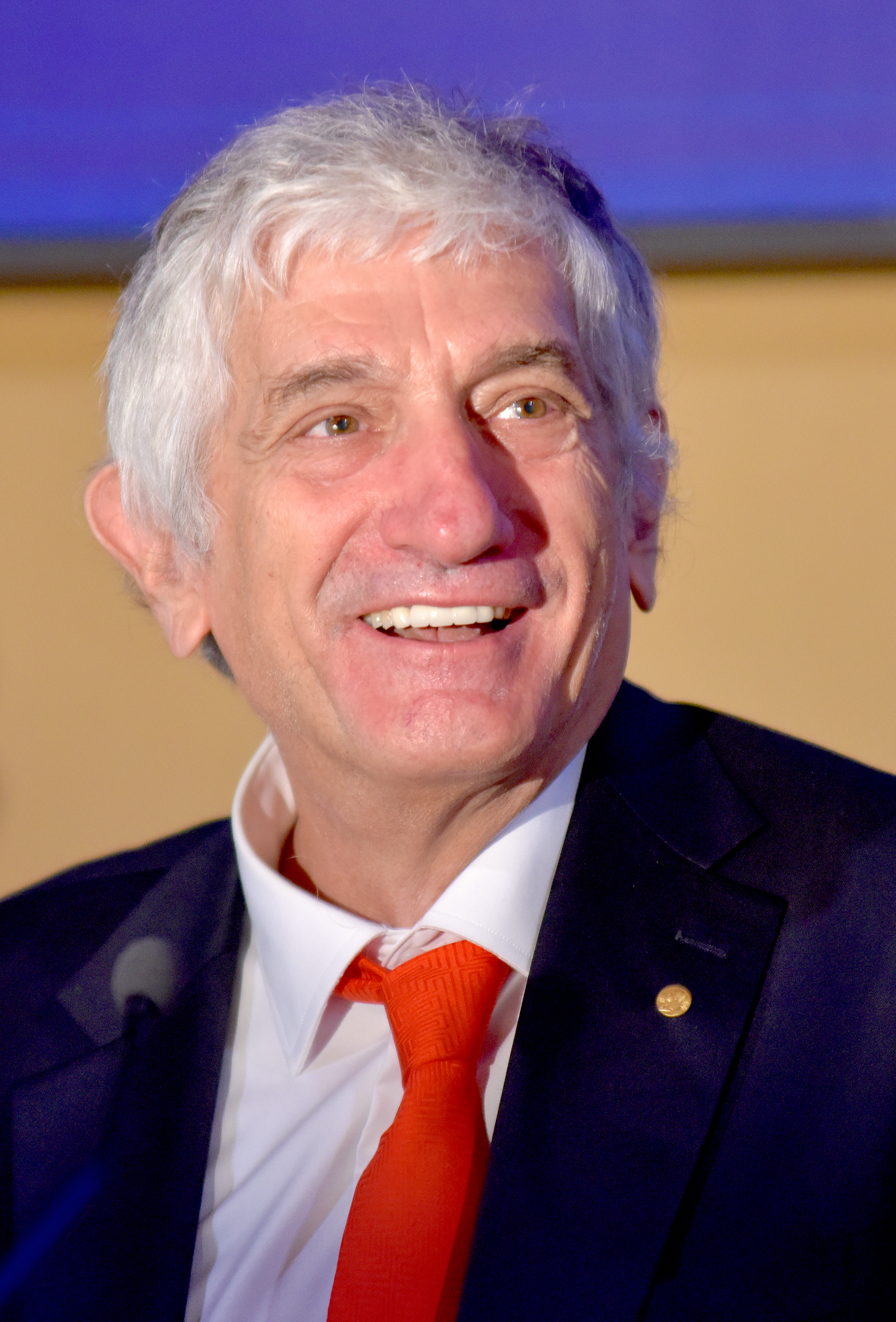
- Martinis in 2025
- Born: John Matthew Martinis; July 13, 1958 (age 68)
- Citizenship: United States; Croatia (since 2026)
- Education: University of California, Berkeley: B.S., Physics; Ph.D., Physics
- Awards: Fritz London Memorial Prize (2014); John Stewart Bell Prize (2021); Nobel Prize in Physics (2025)
- Scientific career
- Fields: Physics; Quantum computing
- Workplaces: University of California, Santa Barbara
- Thesis: Macroscopic Quantum Tunneling and Energy-Level Quantization in the Zero Voltage State of the Current-Biased Josephson Junction (1985)
- Doctoral advisor: John Clarke

John Matthew Martinis (born 1958) is an American physicist and Professor of Physics at the University of California, Santa Barbara. He led a team to develop a superconducting quantum computer at the Quantum AI Lab. With the Sycamore processor, the team claimed the first evidence of quantum supremacy in 2019. He shared the 2025 Nobel Prize in Physics with John Clarke and Michel Devoret for joint work on macroscopic quantum phenomena in superconductors.

== Early life and education ==
John Matthew Martinis was born in 1958 and raised in San Pedro, Los Angeles. His father, a Croat from Komiža on the island of Vis near Split, Croatia, immigrated to the United States from Yugoslavia to escape the communist regime. His mother was born in San Pedro to parents who had also emigrated from Croatia.

Martinis studied physics at the University of California, Berkeley, where he received a Bachelor of Science in 1980 and a Doctor of Philosophy in 1987.

During his doctoral studies, Martinis investigated the quantum behaviour of a macroscopic variable, the phase difference across a Josephson tunnel junction. His doctoral advisor was John Clarke. During this time, he collaborated with Michel Devoret, a postdoctoral researcher at the time.

Martinis giving a lecture in 2017

In 1985, Clarke, Devoret, and Martinis presented their analysis of microwave pulses that demonstrated the quantized energy levels of a Josephson junction. This work would later become the basis for superconducting quantum computing.

On September 21, 2026, the Prime Minister of Croatia, Andrej Plenković, granted Martinis Croatian citizenship.

== Career ==
Martinis joined the CEA Paris-Saclay in France for a first postdoc, and then the Electromagnetic Technology division at the National Institute of Standards and Technology (NIST) in Boulder, where he worked on superconducting quantum interference device (SQUID) amplifiers.

Since 2004, Martinis has served on the faculty of the University of California, Santa Barbara. He held the title of Susan and Bruce Worster Chair in Experimental Physics for many years. The quantum device he developed in collaboration with UCSB colleagues was named Science magazine's 2010 Breakthrough of the Year. Google Quantum AI Lab, a partnership between UC Santa Barbara and Google, announced in 2014 that it had hired Martinis and his team in a multimillion dollar deal to build a quantum computer using superconducting qubits. He and his team published a paper in Nature in 2019, where they presented how they achieved quantum supremacy for the first time using the Sycamore processor, a 53-qubit quantum processor. Martinis resigned from Google in April 2020 after being reassigned to an advisory role.

In 2020, Martinis joined Silicon Quantum Computing, a start-up founded in Australia by Professor Michelle Simmons.

In 2026, he was appointed to the President's Council of Advisors on Science and Technology (PCAST) by President Donald Trump.

=== Qolab ===
In 2022, together with CEO Alan Ho, he founded Qolab, a quantum computing private company based on semiconductor chip manufacturing.

Since 2025, Qolab and Hewlett Packard Enterprise (HPE) are co-leading a consortium for the DARPA Quantum Benchmarking Initiative (QBI). The team is tasked with building an industrially useful quantum supercomputer by 2033. Within this partnership, Martinis and Qolab lead the hardware build, designing and fabricating the core superconducting quantum processors. In December 2025, Qolab launched Qolab Start, a superconducting qubit platform for hardware research and workforce development. Built for universities, research labs, and workforce training, it eliminates the need to build custom labs by providing pre-packaged hardware and direct access to quantum processors. Researchers can access these systems via an on-premise installation or through the cloud. In February 2026, Singapore's National Quantum Federated Foundry (NQFF) and Qolab formed a research collaboration to build integrated cryogenic low-pass filters (LPFs) for quantum processors.

Martinis is the co-leader of Quantum Scaling Alliance (QSA), a global group that develops quantum computing technology and include Qolab as well as others such as Applied Materials, HPE, Synopsys.

== Recognition ==
=== Awards ===
Year	Organization	Award	Co-recipients	Citation	Ref.
2014	Duke University	Fritz London Memorial Prize	Michel Devoret and Robert J. Schoelkopf	"In recognition of fundamental and pioneering experimental advances in quantum control, quantum information processing and quantum optics with superconducting qubits and microwave photons."	
2021	Centre for Quantum Information and Quantum Control	John Stewart Bell Prize	—	"For Research on Fundamental Issues in Quantum Mechanics and Their Applications."	
2025	Royal Swedish Academy of Sciences	Nobel Prize in Physics	Michel Devoret and John Clarke	"For the discovery of macroscopic quantum mechanical tunnelling and energy quantisation in an electric circuit."	

=== Honors ===
Year	Country	Honor	Ref.
2026	Croatia	Grand Order of King Dmitar Zvonimir	
