= Jerry M. Chow =

American physicist

Jerry Moy Chow
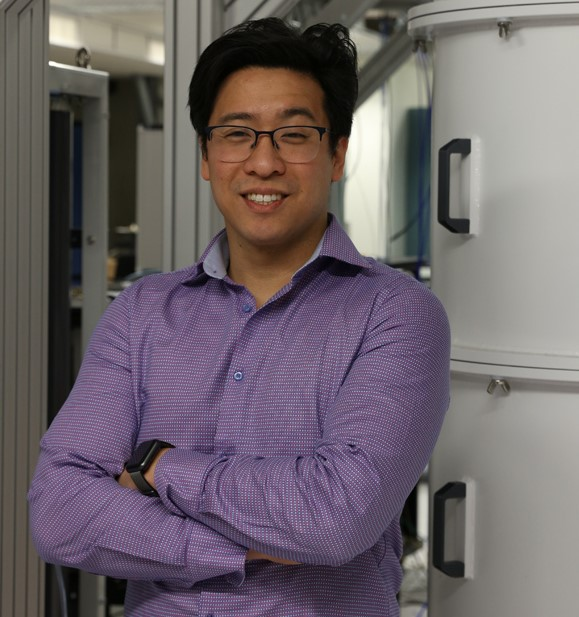
- Jerry M. Chow at IBM Research in Yorktown Heights, NY USA
- Education: Harvard University (B.A.), Harvard University (M.S.), Yale University (Ph.D.)
- Known for: Work on superconducting quantum computing.
- Awards: Forbes 30 Under 30: Technology (2012)
- Scientific career
- Fields: Physics, Quantum information science, Superconducting quantum computing
- Workplaces: Thomas J. Watson Research Center
- Thesis: Quantum Information Processing with Superconducting Qubits (2010)
- Doctoral advisor: Robert J. Schoelkopf
- Website: IBM Research

Jerry Moy Chow is a physicist who conducts research in quantum information processing. He has worked as the manager of the Experimental Quantum Computing group at the IBM Thomas J. Watson Research Center in Yorktown Heights, New York since 2014 and is the primary investigator of the IBM team for the IARPA Multi-Qubit Coherent Operations and Logical Qubits programs. After graduating magna cum laude with a B.A. in physics and M.S. in applied mathematics from Harvard University, he went on to earn his Ph.D. in 2010 under Robert J. Schoelkopf at Yale University. While at Yale, he participated in experiments in which superconducting qubits were coupled via a cavity bus for the first time and two-qubit algorithms were executed on a superconducting quantum processor.

His work at IBM has led to the publication of findings related to the characterization of a universal set of all-microwave gates that can be executed on two transmon qubits, as well as the implementation of a subsection of a surface code fault-tolerant superconducting quantum computing architecture. His leadership at IBM has led to progress being made in quantum error correction and quantum machine learning, as well as the release of the cloud-based IBM Quantum Experience. He was named a Fellow of the American Physical Society in 2021.

== Personal life ==
Jerry grew up in the Sheepshead Bay neighborhood of Brooklyn.

== Patents ==
- U.S. Patent 20140368234 A1 “Multiple-qubit wave-activated controlled gate”, Jerry M. Chow, Jay M. Gambetta, Seth T. Merkel, Chad T. Rigetti, Matthias Steffen
- U.S. Patent 9059674 B2 “Multi-tunable superconducting circuits”, Jerry M. Chow, Antonio D. Corcoles Gonzalez, Jay M. Gambetta, Matthias Steffen
