= Merle Tuve =

American geophysicist (1901–1982)

Merle Antony Tuve
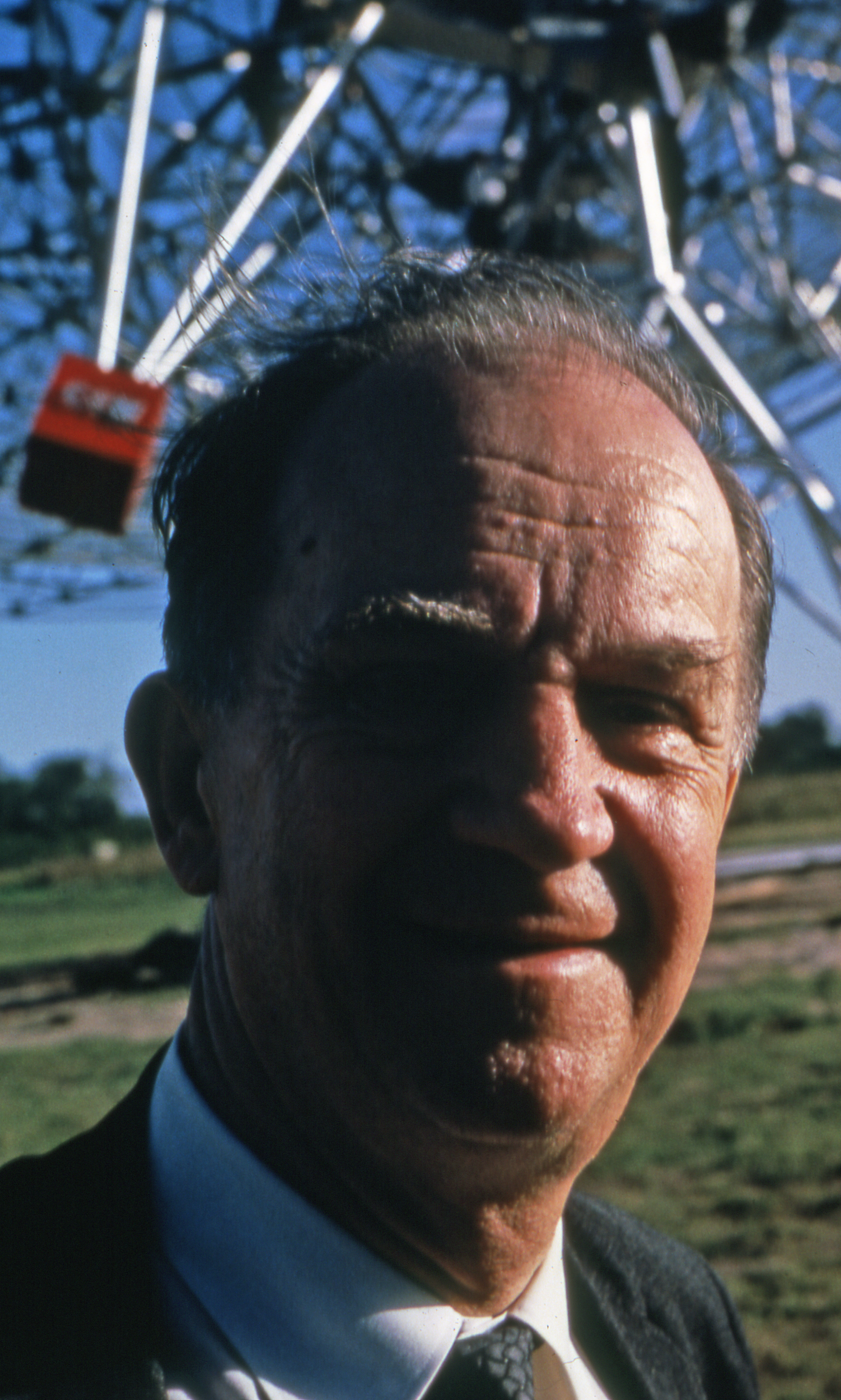
- Tuve in 1966
- Born: June 27, 1901; Canton, South Dakota, U.S.
- Died: May 20, 1982 (aged 80); Bethesda, Maryland
- Education: University of Minnesota (BS, MS); Johns Hopkins University (PhD)
- Awards: Presidential Medal for Merit; Comstock Prize in Physics (1948); Barnard Medal for Meritorious Service to Science (1955); William Bowie Medal (1963); Howard N. Potts Medal; John Scott Award
- Scientific career
- Fields: Physics
- Workplaces: Johns Hopkins University Applied Physics Laboratory (1942-1946); Carnegie Institution for Science (1946-66)

Merle Antony Tuve (June 27, 1901 – May 20, 1982) was an American geophysicist who was the Chairman of Office of Scientific Research and Development (OSRD) Section T, created in August 1940. He was founding director of the Johns Hopkins University Applied Physics Laboratory, the main laboratory of Section T from 1942 on during World War II. He pioneered the use of pulsed radio waves whose discovery opened the way to the development of radar and nuclear energy.

== Background ==
Merle Antony Tuve was born in Canton, South Dakota.

== Career ==
He led in the development of the proximity fuze first at the Department of Terrestrial Magnetism and then later at the Johns Hopkins University Applied Physics Laboratory and also made contributions to experimental seismology, radio astronomy, and optical astronomy.

== Honors ==
Tuve was elected to the American Philosophical Society in 1943. For his service to the nation during World War II, Tuve received the Presidential Medal for Merit from President Harry S. Truman and was named an Honorary Commander of the Order of the British Empire in 1948. He was elected to the American Academy of Arts and Sciences in 1950. Mount Tuve in Ellsworth Land in Antarctica was named in honor of Merle Antony Tuve. The Library of Congress holds his papers in more than 400 archival boxes.

== Awards ==
- William Bowie Medal awarded by the American Geophysical Union
- Howard N. Potts Medal presented by the Franklin Institute of Philadelphia, Pennsylvania
- Comstock Prize in Physics awarded by the National Academy of Sciences (1948)
- Order of the Condor of the Andes issued by the nation of Bolivia
- Cosmos Club Award issued by the Cosmos Club
- John Scott Award issued by the City of Philadelphia

== Selected works ==
- Velocity structures in Hydrogen Profiles: A sky atlas of neutral hydrogen emission (1973)
- The Third Cosmos Club Award: Merle A. Tuve (1966)
- The Forces Which Govern the Atomic Nucleus (1938)
