= Comstock Prize in Physics =

Physics award

The Comstock Prize in Physics is awarded by the U.S. National Academy of Sciences "for recent innovative discovery or investigation in electricity, magnetism, or radiant energy, broadly interpreted."

Honorees must be residents of North America. Named after Cyrus B. Comstock, it has been awarded about every five years since 1913.

== List of Comstock Prize winners ==
| Year | Recipient | Citation |
|---|---|---|
| 1913 | Robert A. Millikan | For his researches on the charge of the electron, on the exact value of the ratio of electric charge to mass and on valency in gaseous ionization. |
| 1918 | Samuel Jackson Barnett | For investigations in magnetization by rotation. |
| 1923 | William Duane | For his work on "relations of fundamental significance...in their bearings upon modern theories of the structure of matter and on the mechanism of radiation." |
| 1928 | Clinton J. Davisson | In recognition of his experimental work demonstrating that under certain conditions, electrons behave as we would expect trains of waves to behave. |
| 1933 | Percy W. Bridgman | For his investigations leading to increased understanding of the electrical constitution of matter. |
| 1938 | Ernest O. Lawrence | For the development of the cyclotron and the results in the field of the transmutation of the elements which have been obtained with the aid of this new technique. |
| 1943 | Donald W. Kerst | For his pioneer work in connection with the development of the betatron and the results which he obtained with this new and powerful scientific tool. |
| 1948 | Merle A.Tuve | For his pioneering work on the upper atmosphere and his development of the electrical pulse method of study; for his pioneering work in nuclear physics utilizing the electrostatic generator; and for his development of the proximity fuse. |
| 1953 | William Shockley | For his pioneering investigations and exposition of electric and magnetic properties of solid materials; in particular for his researches in the conduction of electricity by electrons and holes in semiconductors. |
| 1958 | Charles H. Townes | |
| 1963 | C. S. Wu | |
| 1968 | Leon N Cooper and J. Robert Schrieffer | |
| 1973 | Robert H. Dicke | |
| 1978 | Raymond Davis, Jr. | |
| 1983 | Theodor W. Hänsch and Peter P. Sorokin | |
| 1988 | Paul C. W. Chu and Maw-Kuen Wu | For discovery of superconductivity in yttrium barium copper oxide and similar compounds above the boiling point of nitrogen -- a major scientific and technological breakthrough. |
| 1993 | Charles P. Slichter (shared) | For his seminal contributions to the development and application of magnetic resonance in condensed matter, including the first experimental proof of pairing correlations in superconductors and fundamental studies in surface science and catalysis. |
| 1993 | E. L. Hahn (shared) | For his revolutionary discoveries in magnetic resonance and coherent optics, in particular for the Hahn Spin Echo, the Hartman-Hahn Cross-polarization, and self-induced transparency. |
| 1999 | John Clarke | For his major contributions to the development of superconducting quantum interference devices (SQUIDS) and their use for scientific measurements, especially involving electricity, magnetism, and electromagnetic waves. |
| 2004 | John N. Bahcall | For his many contributions to astrophysics, especially his definitive work on solar models and his crucial role in identifying and resolving the solar neutrino problem. |
| 2009 | Charles L. Bennett | For his mapping of the cosmic microwave background and determining the universe's age, mass-energy content, geometry, expansion rate, and reionization epoch with unprecedented precision. |
| 2014 | Deborah S. Jin | For demonstrating quantum degeneracy and the formation of a molecular Bose‐Einstein condensate in ultra‐cold fermionic atomic gases, and for pioneering work in polar molecular quantum chemistry. |
| 2019 | Michal Lipson | For her pioneering contributions to silicon photonics based on high confinement optical structures including the demonstration of electro-optic modulation in silicon, parametric oscillation, and extreme confinement of light in waveguides. |
| 2024 | Michel Devoret and Robert Schoelkopf | For the experimental development of 'Circuit QED,' realizing non-linear quantum optics in electrical circuits at the single-photon level and enabling new insights into, and control of, macroscopic quantum systems, quantum measurements, quantum information processing and quantum error correction. |

== See also ==
- List of physics awards
- Prizes named after people
