= David McClelland (physicist) =

Australian physicist

David Ernest McClelland
- Born: 26 September 1956; Perth
- Known for: Optical squeezing, Gravitational-wave detectors
- Awards: Joseph F. Keithley Award for Advances in Measurement Science (2013); Special Breakthrough Prize in Fundamental Physics (2016); Gruber Cosmology Prize (2016); Walter Boas Medal (2017); QCMC Award in Quantum Experimentation (2018); Australian Prime Minister's Prize for Science (2020)
- Scientific career
- Fields: Physics
- Workplaces: The Australian National University

David Ernest McClelland FAA is an Australian physicist, with his research focused on the development of the manipulation and control of optical quantum states, and its implementation into gravitational wave observatories. He is a Fellow of the Australian Academy of Science, the American Physical Society and the Optical Society of America. Since 2001, he has been a professor at the Australian National University (ANU) in the Research School of Physics and Engineering, in Canberra (Australia). He is Director of the ANU's Centre for Gravitational Astrophysics and Deputy Director of OzGrav - the Australian Research Council Centre of Excellence in Gravitational Wave Discovery.

== Biography ==
=== Career ===
David McClelland received his PhD degree from the University of Otago, New Zealand, in 1987. He was awarded a Beverly Research Fellowship before being appointed in 1988 to the Australian National University, as a Lecturer.

In 1990, at the ANU, McClelland and his colleagues (H. Bachor, P. Manson, P. Fisk and D. Hope) demonstrated -0.8 dB of optical squeezing at a few hundred mega Hertz using barium atoms. Over the years he established the Centre for Gravitational Physics at the ANU, and buildt a research group working on a squeezed light source in the audio-frequency band for future gravitational wave detectors.

In 1998 he became the chair of the Australian Consortium for Interferometric Gravitational Astronomy (ACIGA). This is a consortium of 6 Australian institutions collaborating and working on research and development for current and future gravitational wave detectors around the world. Its members contributed to the LIGO instrument and data analyses for the first direct detection of gravitational waves of a merger of a binary black hole merger.

In late 2003 with his graduate students they demonstrated squeezing down to a few hundred Hertz using nonlinear crystals. This technique and implementation is still used to produce the best optical squeezers in the world.

In 2020 he established the Centre for Gravitational Astrophysics that is a joint facility of ANU Research School of Physics and Research School of Astronomy and Astrophysics.

== Works ==
He has published over 300 journal articles. He was the lead investigator for the Australian hardware contribution to the Advanced LIGO (USA) that, in September 2015, made the first direct observation of gravitational waves.

== Recognition ==
He is a recipient of the Joseph F Keithley Award for Advances in Measurement Science (2013) and the 2017 Walter Boas Medal. Currently he is a Distinguished Professor at The Australian National University in Canberra (Australia).

In 2020 he was a joint recipient of the Australian Prime Minister's Prize for Science for his leadership of the Australian contribution to gravitational wave detection.

In 2021 he was awarded the Thomas Ranken Lyle Medal of the Australian Academy of Science for his work on quantum enhancement of gravitational wave detectors using squeezed states of light.
