= Nergis Mavalvala =

Quantum astrophysicist (born 1968)

- Born: 1968 (age 57–58); Lahore, Pakistan
- Known for: Interferometric gravitational waves, quantum measurement
- Awards: 2013 Joseph F. Keithley Award For Advances in Measurement Science, MacArthur Fellows
- Scientific career
- Fields: Astrophysics and Quantum Physics
- Workplaces: Wellesley College; Massachusetts Institute of Technology
- Thesis: Alignment issues in laser interferometric gravitational-wave detectors (1997)
- Doctoral advisor: Rainer Weiss

Nergis Mavalvala (born 1968) is a Pakistani-American astrophysicist. She is the Curtis and Kathleen Marble Professor of Astrophysics at the Massachusetts Institute of Technology (MIT), where she is also the dean of the university's school of science. She was previously the Associate Head of the university's Department of Physics. Mavalvala is best known for her work on the detection of gravitational waves in the Laser Interferometer Gravitational-Wave Observatory (LIGO) project, and for the exploration and experimental demonstration of macroscopic quantum effects such as squeezing in optomechanics. She was awarded a MacArthur Fellowship in 2010.

== Early life and education ==
Mavalvala was born in Lahore, but primarily raised in Karachi, Pakistan. Born to a Parsi family that practiced Zoroastrianism, Mavalvala was the younger of the two children. She attended the Convent of Jesus and Mary, Karachi, where she received her O-Level and later, moved to the United States in 1986 and enrolled at Wellesley College, where she received a bachelor's degree in physics and astronomy in 1990. She then joined Rainer Weiss's group in the MIT physics department and received her PhD in 1997.

== Career ==
As a graduate student at MIT, she conducted her doctoral work under Rainer Weiss, developing a prototype laser interferometer for detecting gravitational waves. After graduate school, she worked as a postdoctoral researcher and then as a research scientist at the California Institute of Technology, starting her work with cosmic microwave background, and eventually working on the LIGO. Mavalvala focuses primarily on two fields of physics: Gravitational-wave astrophysics and quantum measurement science. Mavalvala joined the MIT physics faculty in 2002. In 2017 she was elected to the National Academy of Sciences.

=== Detection of gravitational waves ===
Mavalvala was part of the team of scientists who, for the first time, detected ripples in the fabric of spacetime known as gravitational waves. Mavalvala has been working on gravitational waves since 1991. After the announcement of the observation, she became an instant celebrity scientist in her birthplace of Pakistan. A statement by the Prime Minister of Pakistan Nawaz Sharif praised Mavalvala, calling her a source of inspiration for Pakistani scientists and students aspiring to become future scientists. He also stated that "the entire nation is proud of her valuable contribution."

On 20 February 2016, Ambassador of Pakistan to the United States, Jalil Abbas Jilani, conveyed the Government of Pakistan's message of felicitation to Mavalvala for her outstanding achievement in the field of astrophysics. He also invited her to re-visit Pakistan, which she accepted.

=== Laser cooling ===
Optical cooling of mirrors to nearly absolute zero can help eliminate measurement noise arising from thermal vibrations. A portion of Mavalvala's work focused on the extension of laser-cooling techniques to optically cool and trap more and more massive objects, both for the LIGO project and for other applications, such as to enable observation of quantum phenomena in macroscopic objects. Prominent results from her group in this area included the cooling of a centimeter-scale object to a temperature of 0.8 kelvin and the observation of a 2.7-kilogram pendulum near its quantum ground state. These experiments lay the foundations for observing quantum behavior in human-scale objects.

=== Quantum states of light ===
Mavalvala has also worked on the development of exotic quantum states of light, and in particular the generation of light in squeezed coherent states. By injecting such states into the kilometre-scale Michelson interferometer of the LIGO detectors, her group greatly improved the sensitivity of the detector by reducing quantum noise; such squeezed states also have many other applications in experimental physics. Her group was the first to generate squeezed light using optomechanics at room temperature, compared to all previous optomechanical squeezed light sources that operated at cryogenic (very low) temperatures.

== Personal life ==
Mavalvala is a lesbian and speaks openly on her sexual orientation and family history as a Pakistani immigrant, describing herself as an "out, queer person of color." Mavalvala stated that she was not aware of her sexual orientation until after college. Mavalvala is frequently questioned about how she was able to break through the barrier of gender roles and pursue a career of her choice. In an interview with the Pakistani newspaper Dawn, Mavalvala states, "I grew up in a family where the stereotypical gender roles were not really observed. So I grew up thinking women can, must and should do anything and everything. That is very important for me." She also speaks about the ability of individuals in Pakistan to break gender roles and stigmas: "Anybody should be able to do those things. And I am proof of that because I am all of those things. With the right combination of opportunity, it was possible for me to do."

Mavalvala is often viewed as a role model for aspiring female scientists with roots in the South Asia. As a young child Mavalvala was frequently involved in handy work, and was not bound to stereotypical gender roles in subcontinent culture, due to the manner in which her sister and she were raised. Mavalvala states that much of her success is accredited to good mentors in both the United States and Pakistan that encouraged her academic ability. In a television interview in 2016, Mavalvala stated, "When everyone has access to education that's when all the other things come into place... [You've] got to do what gives you pleasure, gotta find a way to do it. People should just do what they enjoy most and I think for all of society whether it's in Pakistan or elsewhere we have to create opportunities for young girls to do what they're good at and do what they love to do must cultivate the sense of wonder in a child."

Mavalvala and her partner have two children and reside in Cambridge, Massachusetts in the United States. Mavalvala has extended family in Karachi and visited the city in 2010.

She visited Cedar College (a prominent A Level School) on the 23rd of September 2026, in Karachi, Pakistan; giving a lecture on "The Quest for Gravitational Waves".

== Awards and recognition ==
- 2022, Wellesley’s 2022 Commencement Speaker
- 2017, Mavalvala won the first Lahore Technology Award launched by Information Technology University
- 2017, the Carnegie Corporation of New York honored Mavalvala as one of its Great Immigrants awards recipients. The awards go to "naturalized citizens who have made notable contributions to the progress of American society."
- 2016, co-recipient Gruber Prize in Cosmology
- 2016, co-recipient Special Breakthrough Prize in Fundamental Physics, as a part of LIGO team
- 2014, NOGLSTP recognized Mavalvala as the LGBTQ Scientist of the Year.
- 2014, Optica Fellow
- 2013, Joseph F. Keithley Award For Advances in Measurement Science by the American Physical Society
- 2010, MacArthur Fellow
- 2010, American Physical Society Fellow
- 2007, Edgerton award for faculty achievement at Massachusetts Institute of Technology
- 2005, Sloan Research Fellowship
- 1990, Phyllis Fleming Award for Excellence in Physics
