= Humphrey Maris =

Physicist (1939–2025)

- Born: April 25, 1939; Ipswich, England
- Died: July 28, 2025 (aged 86); Rhode Island
- Education: Imperial College London
- Scientific career
- Workplaces: Brown University
- Website: vivo.brown.edu/display/hmaris

Humphrey John Maris (April 25, 1939 – July 28, 2025) was an American-British physicist and a professor at Brown University from 1965 to 2014. He specialized in research on low-temperature physics and ultrafast ultrasonics.

He attended Imperial College London receiving a B.Sc. degree in 1960 and a Ph.D. in 1963. He was a postdoctoral fellow at Case Institute of Technology from 1963 to 1965. In 1965 he became a professor at Brown. In 1991 he was made the George Chase Professor of Natural Science. He led experiments into the nature of the quantum state of the electron. His patent on a method of nondestructive evaluation of semiconductors is widely used. He retired in 2014. He died of complications of Parkinson's Disease in 2025.

== Honors and awards ==
Maris has received the following honors and awards.

- UK Science Research Council Fellowship, 1972
- Japanese Society for Promotion of Science Senior Fellowship, 1982
- Senior Alexander Von Humboldt Award,1989
- Japanese Society for Promotion of Science Senior Fellowship, 2003
- Brown University Award for Technical Innovation and Commercialization, 2005
- Prize for Phonon Physics, (Klemens award) 2007
- Phillip J. Bray Award for Excellence in Teaching in the physical sciences, 2009
- Fritz London Memorial Award for Low Temperature Physics, 2011
- Brown Technology Innovation Impact Award, 2023
