= John Stewart Bell Prize =

Award for quantum mechanics and their applications

- Awarded for: Significant contributions to quantum mechanics
- Country: Canada
- Presented by: Centre for Quantum Information and Quantum Control
- First award: 2009; 17 years ago
- Website: cqiqc.physics.utoronto.ca/bell-prize

The John Stewart Bell Prize for Research on Fundamental Issues in Quantum Mechanics and their Applications (short form: Bell Prize) was established in 2009, funded and managed by the Centre for Quantum Information and Quantum Control (CQIQC) in the University of Toronto Faculty of Arts and Science. Named after John Stewart Bell (the physicist behind Bell's theorem, a theorem whose experimental vindication led to a Nobel Prize), it is generally awarded every second year, for significant contributions relating to the foundations of quantum mechanics and to the applications of these principles – this covers, but is not limited to, quantum information theory, quantum computation, quantum foundations, quantum cryptography and quantum control. The selection committee has included Gilles Brassard, Peter Zoller, Alain Aspect, John Preskill, and Juan Ignacio Cirac Sasturain, in addition to previous winners Sandu Popescu, Michel Devoret and Nicolas Gisin.

== Awarded prizes ==
Year	Medalists	Affiliation	Reason
2009	Nicolas Gisin	Université de Genève	For his theoretical and experimental work on quantum nonlocality, quantum cryptography and quantum teleportation.
2011	Sandu Popescu	University of Bristol, UK	For discoveries of stronger-than-quantum no-signaling correlations, and the application of quantum theory to thermodynamics.
2013	Michel Devoret	Yale University, USA	For their work on entangling superconducting qubits and microwave photons, and their application to quantum information processing.
2013	Robert J. Schoelkopf	Yale University, USA	For their work on entangling superconducting qubits and microwave photons, and their application to quantum information processing.
2015	Rainer Blatt	University of Innsbruck and IQOQI	For his works on quantum information processing with trapped ions.
2017	Ronald Hanson	Delft University of Technology	For "their groups’ experiments simultaneously closing the detection and locality loopholes in a violation of Bell's Inequalities".
2017	Sae Woo Nam	National Institute of Standards and Technology	For "their groups’ experiments simultaneously closing the detection and locality loopholes in a violation of Bell's Inequalities".
2017	Anton Zeilinger	University of Vienna	For "their groups’ experiments simultaneously closing the detection and locality loopholes in a violation of Bell's Inequalities".
2019	Ignacio Cirac	Max Planck Institute of Quantum Optics	For "groundbreaking proposals in quantum optics and atomic physics on how to engineer quantum systems . . . and using Projected Entangled Pair States for the theoretical study of quantum many body systems".
2019	Peter Zoller	University of Innsbruck and IQOQI	For "groundbreaking proposals in quantum optics and atomic physics on how to engineer quantum systems . . . and using Projected Entangled Pair States for the theoretical study of quantum many body systems".
2021	John M. Martinis	University of California, Santa Barbara	For innovations in designing and controlling superconducting devices
2024	John Preskill	California Institute of Technology	For "developments at the interface of efficient learning and processing of quantum information in quantum computation, and following upon long standing intellectual leadership in near-term quantum computing."
2026	Antoine Browaeys	CNRS and Université Paris-Saclay	For "pioneering contributions to quantum simulation and quantum computing with neutral atoms in optical tweezer arrays, including the development of large-scale programmable arrays for scalable quantum computation"
2026	Mikhail Lukin	Harvard University	For "pioneering contributions to quantum simulation and quantum computing with neutral atoms in optical tweezer arrays, including the development of large-scale programmable arrays for scalable quantum computation"
2026	Mark Saffman	University of Wisconsin - Madison	For "pioneering contributions to quantum simulation and quantum computing with neutral atoms in optical tweezer arrays, including the development of large-scale programmable arrays for scalable quantum computation"

== See also ==
- List of physics awards
