= John Clarke (physicist) =

British physicist (born 1942)

John Clarke FRS
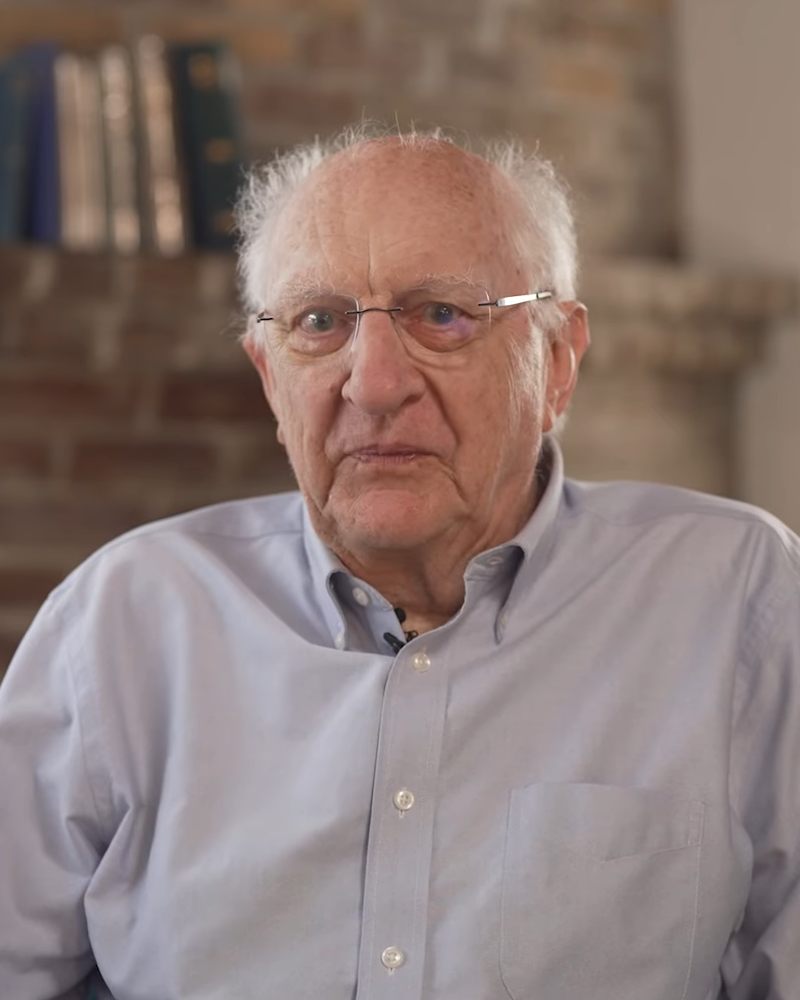
- Clarke in 2025
- Born: 10 February 1942 (age 84); Cambridge, England
- Education: University of Cambridge: MA (Cantab); PhD, Physics
- Known for: Macroscopic quantum phenomena; SQUIDs
- Awards: Joseph F. Keithley Award (1998); Comstock Prize in Physics (1999); Hughes Medal (2004); Micius Quantum Prize (2021); Nobel Prize in Physics (2025)
- Scientific career
- Fields: Physics
- Workplaces: University of California, Berkeley
- Doctoral advisor: Brian Pippard
- Doctoral students: John M. Martinis

John Clarke (born 10 February 1942) is a British experimental physicist and Professor Emeritus at the University of California, Berkeley. He is known for his various works on measurement devices based on superconductivity. Steven Girvin has called Clarke "the godfather of superconducting electronics."

In the 1980s, Clarke led a research team that included John M. Martinis and Michel Devoret. Their discoveries in macroscopic quantum phenomena using the Josephson effect earned them the Nobel Prize in Physics in 2025.

== Education and career ==
John Clarke was born on 10 February 1942 in Cambridge, England. He attended The Perse School, before going to study Natural Sciences at Christ's College, Cambridge, where he graduated with a Bachelor of Arts in 1964.

In 1965, Clarke became one of the first students to enter the newly-founded Darwin College, Cambridge, and was the first president of the Darwin College students' association. While conducting his doctoral work under Brian Pippard, Clarke developed a very sensitive voltmeter, which he later called "SLUG" (Superconducting Low-inductance Undulatory Galvanometer). He obtained both a Master of Arts and a Doctor of Philosophy in 1968. Clarke has said at various times that his work was influenced by Nobel laureate Brian Josephson, who predicted the Josephson effect in 1962 and was also a previous student of Pippard.

After completing his doctorate, Clarke gained a postdoctoral research position at the University of California, Berkeley, and subsequently worked at Berkeley for his whole academic career, as Assistant Professor (1969), Associate Professor (1971), and as Professor of Physics (1973–2010). In 1969, Clarke also joined Lawrence Berkeley National Laboratory, eventually retiring as a faculty senior scientist in the Materials Sciences Division in 2010.

Clarke's association with the University of Cambridge continued, after he moved to the United States. In 1972, he was elected a Fellow of Christ's College; in 1989, he was a visiting fellow at Clare Hall, Cambridge, and in 1998 was elected a by-fellow of Churchill College, Cambridge. Clarke was awarded a Doctor of Science from the University of Cambridge in 2003. He was elected an Honorary Fellow of Christ's College in 1997, and of Darwin College in 2023.

== Research ==
Clarke's research focuses on superconductivity and superconducting electronics, particularly in the development and application of superconducting quantum interference devices (SQUIDs), which are ultrasensitive detectors of magnetic flux.

In 1985, Clarke, John M. Martinis (his PhD student), and Michel Devoret (a postdoctoral researcher at the time) demonstrated the quantum behaviour of a Josephson junction. They showed that at low temperature, a macroscopic electronic state associated with superconductors underwent quantum tunnelling at zero voltage. The same year, by sending microwave pulses of the system, the resonances showed quantised energy levels. This experiment was the first evidence of circuit quantum electrodynamics, that would become later the basis for superconducting quantum computing. The work, which was recognized with the Nobel Prize in Physics in 2025, was largely funded by the Office of Basic Energy Sciences in the United States Department of Energy.

Clarke has also worked in the application of SQUIDs configured as quantum-noise limited amplifiers to search for the axion, a possible component of dark matter.

== Recognition ==
Clarke obtained an Alfred P. Sloan fellowship (1970) and a Guggenheim Fellowship (1977).

=== Memberships ===
Year	Organisation	Type	Ref.
1986	Royal Society	Fellow	
2012	National Academy of Sciences	International Member	
2017	American Philosophical Society	Member	

=== Awards ===
Year	Organisation	Award	Co-recipients	Citation	Ref.
1998	American Physical Society	Joseph F. Keithley Award	—	"For his experimental and theoretical studies of Superconducting Quantum Interference Devices (SQUIDs), advancing the state-of-the-art of measurement science by applying SQUIDs to many areas of both fundamental and applied physics such as high-Tc superconductor analyses, NMR amplifiers, and cryogenic comparators."	
1999	National Academy of Sciences	Comstock Prize in Physics	—	"For his major contributions to the development of superconducting quantum interference devices (SQUIDS) and their use for scientific measurements, especially involving electricity, magnetism, and electromagnetic waves."	
2004	Royal Society	Hughes Medal	—	"For his outstanding research, leading the world in the invention, building and development of innovative new Superconducting QUantum Interference Devices (SQUID), in their theory and in their application to a plethora of fundamental problems and their investigative tools."	
2021	Micius Quantum Foundation	Micius Quantum Prize	Michel Devoret and Yasunobu Nakamura	"For their leading roles in pioneering superconducting quantum circuits and qubits."	
2025	Royal Swedish Academy of Sciences	Nobel Prize in Physics	Michel Devoret and John M. Martinis	"For the discovery of macroscopic quantum mechanical tunnelling and energy quantisation in an electric circuit."	
2026	American Academy of Achievement	Golden Plate Award	—	“Recipient of the Golden Plate Award as an exemplar of excellence in science and exploration.”	

== Works ==
=== Selected publications ===
- Tesche, Claudia D.; Clarke, John (1 November 1977). "dc SQUID: Noise and optimization". Journal of Low Temperature Physics. 29 (3): 301–331. Bibcode:1977JLTP...29..301T. doi:10.1007/BF00655097. ISSN 1573-7357.
- Clarke, John; Cleland, Andrew N.; Devoret, Michel H.; Esteve, Daniel; Martinis, John M. (26 February 1988). "Quantum Mechanics of a Macroscopic Variable: The Phase Difference of a Josephson Junction". Science. 239 (4843): 992–997. Bibcode:1988Sci...239..992C. doi:10.1126/science.239.4843.992. PMID 17815701.
- Clarke, J. (August 1989). "Principles and applications of SQUIDs". Proceedings of the IEEE. 77 (8): 1208–1223. Bibcode:1989IEEEP..77.1208C. doi:10.1109/5.34120. ISSN 1558-2256.
- McDermott, Robert; Trabesinger, Andreas H.; Muck, Michael; Hahn, Erwin L.; Pines, Alexander; Clarke, John (22 March 2002). "Liquid-state NMR and scalar couplings in microtesla magnetic fields". Science. 295 (5563): 2247–2249. Bibcode:2002Sci...295.2247M. doi:10.1126/science.1069280. ISSN 1095-9203. PMID 11910105.
- Clarke, John; Hatridge, Michael; Mössle, Michael (2007). "SQUID-detected magnetic resonance imaging in microtesla fields". Annual Review of Biomedical Engineering. 9: 389–413. doi:10.1146/annurev.bioeng.9.060906.152010. ISSN 1523-9829. PMID 17328671.

=== Books ===
- Srinath, S. (1 August 2006). Clarke, John (ed.). "A Review of: "The SQUID Handbook: Fundamentals and Technology of SQUIDS and SQUID Systems": John Clarke and Alex I. Braginski (editors), Vol. 1". Materials and Manufacturing Processes. 21 (5): 583. doi:10.1080/10426910500503706. ISSN 1042-6914.
