= Roman Schnabel =

German Physicist (born 1968)

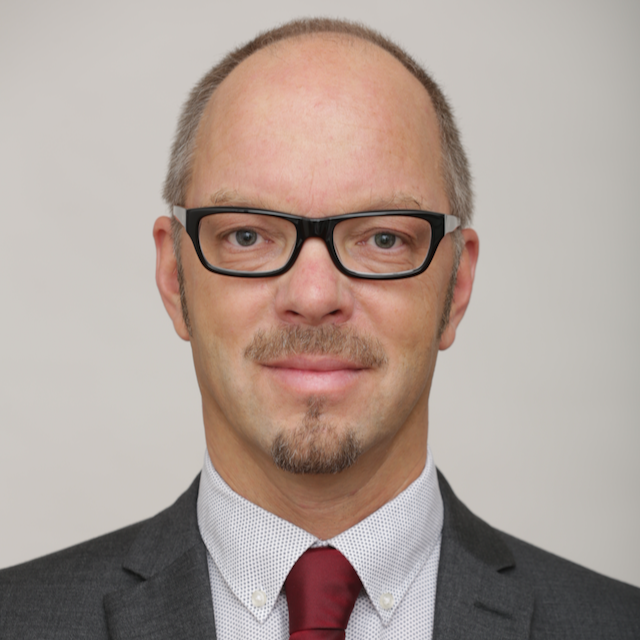
- Citizenship: Germany
- Education: Leibniz University Hannover
- Known for: Squeezed light; Gravitational-wave detection; ERC-project MassQ
- Scientific career
- Fields: Quantum optics Experimental physics
- Workplaces: University of Hamburg

Roman Schnabel (June 11, 1968) is a physics professor at the University of Hamburg. He specializes in gravitational wave detection and quantum optics.

He has made contributions to the field, including the detection of gravitational waves from binary black hole mergers. He received the Special Breakthrough Prize in Fundamental Physics as a member of the LIGO team.
