= Steven Girvin =

American physicist (born 1950)

- Born: April 5, 1950 (age 76); Austin, Texas, U.S.
- Title: Sterling Professor, Physics
- Awards: Oliver E. Buckley Prize (2007)

Academic background
- Education: Bates College (BS); University of Maine (MS); Princeton University (MS, PhD)
- Thesis: Topics in Condensed Matter Physics (1977)
- Doctoral advisor: John J. Hopfield

Academic work
- Discipline: Applied physics; condensed matter physics
- Sub-discipline: Circuit quantum electrodynamics; Fractional quantum Hall effect
- Institutions: Indiana University Bloomington; Yale University

Steven Mark Girvin (born April 5, 1950) is an American physicist who is Sterling Professor of Physics and Professor of Applied Physics at Yale University. He is noted for his theoretical work on quantum many body systems such as the fractional quantum Hall effect, and as co-developer of circuit quantum electrodynamics (circuit QED), the application of the ideas of quantum optics to superconducting microwave circuits. Circuit QED is now the leading architecture for construction of quantum computers based on superconducting qubits.

== Early life and education ==
Steven Mark Girvin was born in Austin, Texas, on April 5, 1950, and attended high school in Brant Lake, New York, graduating with a class of five students. Girvin attended Bates College, where he was a Charles M. Dana Scholar and was elected to Phi Beta Kappa, receiving a B.S. degree in physics in 1971. He also received an M.S. from the University of Maine in 1973.

Girvin later completed postgraduate studies at Princeton University as a National Science Foundation Graduate Fellow, receiving an M.S. in 1974 and a Ph.D. in 1977. His doctoral thesis, published in 1976, was entitled Topics in Condensed Matter Physics: The Role of Exchange in the Lithium K Edge and the Fluorescence Spectrum of Heavily Doped Cadmium Sulphide. His doctoral advisor was John J. Hopfield, who later received the Nobel Prize in Physics in 2024.

== Career ==
=== Early career ===
From 1977 to 1979, Girvin worked as a postdoctoral researcher at both Indiana University Bloomington and Chalmers University of Technology, under the advising of G. D. Mahan. Girvin then held a physicist position at the National Bureau of Standards from 1979 to 1987, where he received the Department of Commerce Bronze Medal for Superior Federal Service in 1983. He joined the faculty of Indiana University in 1987, where he was named Distinguished Professor in 1992, before moving to Yale in 2001.

=== Yale University ===
At Yale, Girvin was initially appointed as the Eugene Higgins Professor of Physics in 2005. In addition to his research and teaching, he served in senior administrative roles: as Deputy Provost for Science and Technology from 2007 to 2015, and as Deputy Provost for Research from 2015 to 2017, overseeing research and strategic planning in the basic sciences and engineering across the university, as well as entrepreneurship, innovation, and technology transfer. In 2017, he stepped down from his administrative role to return full-time to teaching and research.

In September 2020, Girvin was appointed as the founding director of the Co-design Center for Quantum Advantage (C^{2}QA) located at Brookhaven National Laboratory, one of five national quantum information science research centers funded by the Department of Energy. C^{2}QA comprises principal investigators across 24 institutions working on basic research to advance the performance of quantum computer modules. He served in this role until 2021.

In June 2024, Girvin, who was then Eugene Higgins Professor of Physics, became Sterling Professor of Physics, the highest academic honor bestowed upon a Yale faculty member. He holds appointments both as a professor of physics and as a professor of applied physics in the Yale School of Engineering & Applied Science.

Girvin has also served on advisory boards for quantum-focused research centers at the University of Maryland, the University of Washington, the California Institute of Technology, the Kavli Institute for Theoretical Physics, and the Nordic Institute for Theoretical Physics (NORDITA). He was a founding member of scientific advisory boards for the Simons Foundation, serves as chair of the scientific advisory board for the Wallenberg Centre for Quantum Technologies (WACQT) in Sweden, and served on the program committee for the Nobel Symposium on Emerging Quantum Technologies from 2018 to 2022.

== Research ==
Girvin's research focus has been the theoretical study of collective quantum behavior in strongly correlated many-body systems and their phase transitions; he has worked on problems such as the quantum Hall effect, the superconductor–insulator transition, and quantum spin chains. Over his career, he has published more than 300 papers and given more than 600 talks and presentations.

=== Circuit QED ===
He works with experimentalists Robert Schoelkopf and Michel Devoret on the engineering problem of building a quantum computer, and on developing "circuit QED" using superconducting electrical circuits. The group experimentally implemented the first all-electronic quantum processor and executed two-qubit quantum algorithms in 2009. Devoret later received the Nobel Prize in Physics in 2025 for his earlier work on macroscopic quantum tunneling in superconducting circuits.

=== Quantum error correction ===
In 2023, the Yale group, including Girvin, demonstrated real-time quantum error correction beyond the break-even point for the first time, using a bosonic code in a superconducting cavity. This result, published in Nature, showed that an error-corrected logical qubit could outperform its best physical component, a key milestone for the field of quantum computing.

Girvin and collaborators also proposed and demonstrated a dual-rail cavity qubit architecture, in which quantum information is encoded in the single-photon subspace of two superconducting microwave cavities. This approach allows dominant photon loss errors to be detected and converted into erasure errors, which are easier to correct. The proposal was published in the Proceedings of the National Academy of Sciences in 2023, and the experimental demonstration of erasure-detected logical measurements was published in Nature Physics in 2024.

== Books ==
Girvin co-edited the book The Quantum Hall Effect, which has been translated into Japanese, Chinese and Russian. Together with co-author Kun Yang, Girvin published the Cambridge University Press textbook Modern Condensed Matter Physics in 2019.

== Awards and honors ==
Girvin, James P. Eisenstein and Allan H. MacDonald won the 2007 Oliver E. Buckley Condensed Matter Prize for their "Fundamental experimental and theoretical research on correlated many-electron states in low dimensional systems".

- Sterling Professor of Physics, Yale University (2024)
- Hedersdoktor (Honoris Causa Doctorate), Chalmers University of Technology (2017)
- Shared the Oliver E. Buckley Condensed Matter Prize (2007)
- Foreign Member of the Royal Swedish Academy of Sciences (2007)
- Fellow of the American Association for the Advancement of Science (2007)
- Member of the National Academy of Sciences (2006)
- Eugene Higgins Professorship in Physics, Yale University (2005)
- Fellow of the American Academy of Arts and Sciences (2004)
- Conde Award for Teaching Excellence in Physics, Applied Physics, and Astronomy, Yale University (first recipient, 2003)
- Distinguished Professor, Indiana University (1992)
- Fellow of the American Physical Society (1989)
- Department of Commerce Bronze Medal for Superior Federal Service (1983)
- Phi Beta Kappa (Bates College, 1971)
