= Frances M. Ross =

Materials science and engineering professor

Frances Mary Ross
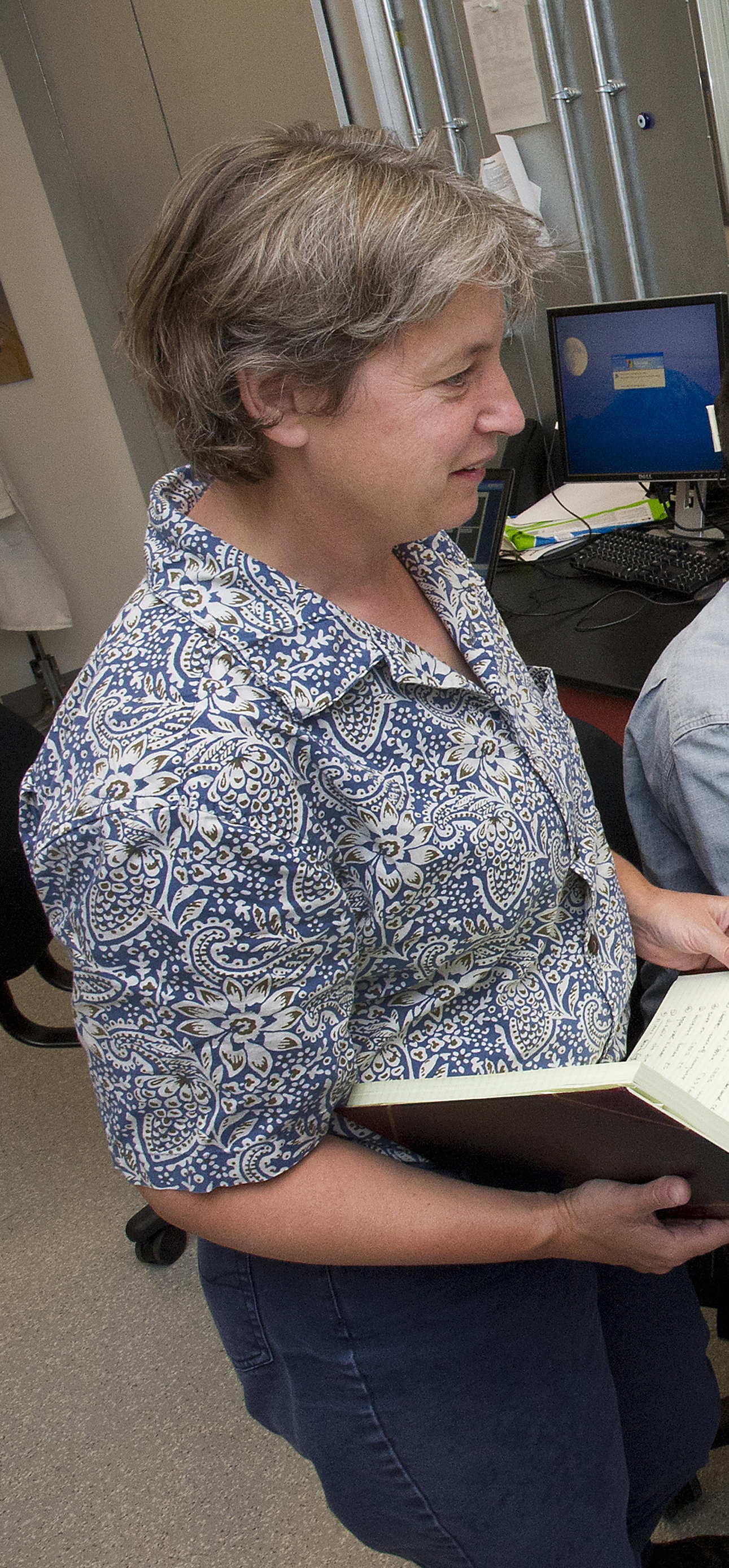
- Frances Ross in the Center for Functional Nanomaterials in 2012
- Education: University of Cambridge
- Known for: Transmission electron microscopy
- Scientific career
- Workplaces: Massachusetts Institute of Technology; AT&T Bell Laboratories; National Center for Electron Microscopy; Thomas J. Watson Research Center

Frances Mary Ross is an American materials scientist. She is the Ellen Swallow Richards Professor in Materials Science and Engineering at the Massachusetts Institute of Technology (MIT). Her work involves the use of in situ transmission electron microscopy to study nanostructure formation.

In 2018, she was awarded the International Federation of Societies for Microscopy Hatsujiro Hashimoto Medal. Ross is a Fellow of the American Association for the Advancement of Science, the American Physical Society, the Microscopy Society of America, the Royal Microscopical Society, and the National Academy of Engineering.

== Early life and education ==
Ross studied Natural Sciences at the University of Cambridge. She moved to the Department of Materials for her doctoral studies, and completed a PhD in materials and metallurgy in 1989. Her doctoral work considered transmission electron microscopy of silicon oxides. She was appointed as a postdoctoral research associate at AT&T Bell Laboratories in 1990. Here she began working with electron microscopy to study silicon oxidation and the dynamics of dislocation.

== Research and career ==
In 1992 Ross started her academic career as a staff scientist in the University of California, Berkeley National Center for Electron Microscopy. She moved to the Thomas J. Watson Research Center in 1997 where she worked as a research staff member. Here she developed various microscopic techniques, including in situ environmental transmission electron microscopy (TEM). By monitoring the growth of materials in situ it is possible to understand the nucleation and growth of materials, including observing individual nucleation events and transient intermediate states. She can change the growth conditions (for example temperature, pressure or choice of solvent) and establish how these variables impact the growth of materials. At IBM Ross monitored self-assembly mechanisms, including the processes by which nanowires form using chemical vapor deposition and the growth of quantum dots. By controlling the growth of nanowires it is possible to form complicated structures, which can be used in transistors, batteries and sensors. To grow the nanowires in an electron microscope Ross uses small catalytic particles, a flat substrate and a gas that contains silicon. She heats the substrate to 500 degrees celsius, at which temperature the gas begins to react with the metal catalysts and depositing silicon beneath the particles. She has demonstrated this nanowire growth for silicon, germanium, gallium arsenide and gallium phosphide. These nanowires can be used to bridge electrical contacts, allowing Ross to understand the relationship between physical structure and electronic performance.

She joined the faculty at Massachusetts Institute of Technology in 2018. Here she is developing a TEM for Two-dimensional materials in one of the MIT quiet rooms. These rooms minimise interference from electromagnetic fields and temperature fluctuations. Ross plans to investigate where three-dimensional nanocrystals grow on two-dimensional materials. She has previously demonstrated that it is possible to use electrochemical electron-beam lithography to write, read and erase these nanocrystals. Two-dimensional materials are difficult to study using conventional equipment because electron microscopes can damage their structures. In an effort to avoid this, Ross has proposed using lower voltage electrons as well as a high vacuum. In 2018 Ross was awarded the Hatsujiro Hashimoto Medal in recognition of her work on electron microscopy.

=== Awards and honours ===
Her awards and honours include;

- 1999 Institute of Physics Moseley medal
- 2000 Materials Research Society Outstanding Young Investigator Award
- 2003 Microscopy Society of America Burton Medal
- 2011 Fellow of the American Physical Society
- 2012 Fellow of the Microscopy Society of America
- 2017 Honorary Fellow of the Royal Microscopical Society
- 2018 Hatsujiro Hashimoto Medal
- 2019 Gerhard Ertl Lecture Award
- 2026 National Academy of Engineering

=== Selected publications ===
Her publications include;

- Ross, Frances (2016). Liquid Cell Electron Microscopy. Cambridge University Press. ISBN 978-1-316-33745-5.
- de Jonge, Niels; Ross, Frances M. (2011). "Electron microscopy of specimens in liquid". Nature Nanotechnology. 6 (11): 695–704. Bibcode:2011NatNa...6..695D. doi:10.1038/nnano.2011.161. PMID 22020120.
- Ross, Frances M.; Reuter, M. C. (1999-12-03). "Transition States Between Pyramids and Domes During Ge/Si Island Growth". Science. 286 (5446): 1931–1934. doi:10.1126/science.286.5446.1931. PMID 10583951.
