= Michel Devoret =

French–American physicist (born 1953)

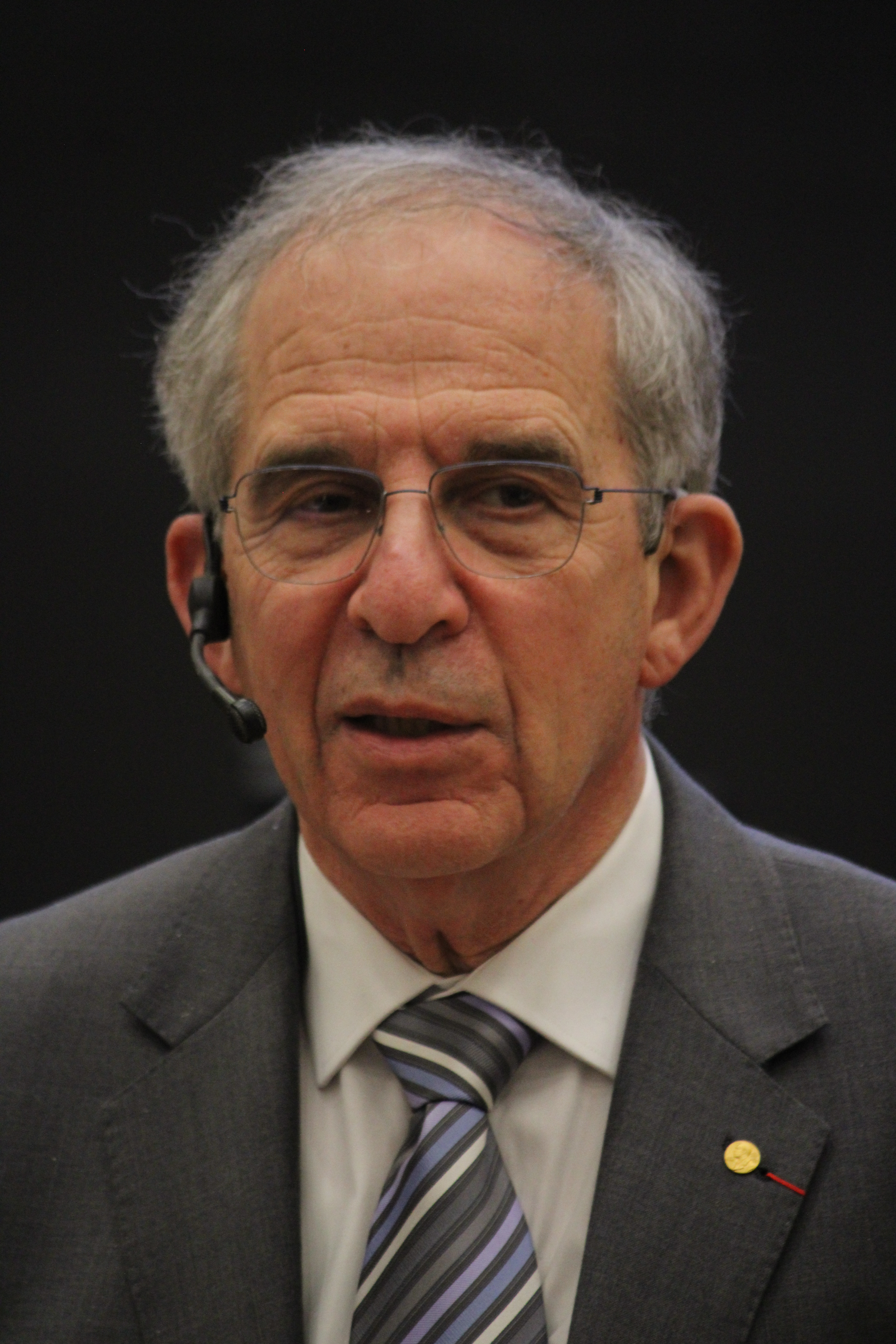
- Devoret in 2025
- Born: Michel Henri Devoret; 5 March 1953 (age 73); Paris, France
- Education: Télécom Paris: Dipl.Ing., Telecommunications Engineering; University of Orsay: DEA, Quantum Optics; PhD, Quantum Condensed Matter Physics
- Known for: Transmon; Fluxonium; Quantum limited amplification
- Awards: Ampère Prize (1991); Descartes–Huygens Prize (1995); EPS Europhysics Prize (2004); John Stewart Bell Prize (2013); Fritz London Memorial Prize (2014); Olli V. Lounasmaa Memorial Prize (2016); Micius Quantum Prize (2021); Comstock Prize in Physics (2024); Nobel Prize in Physics (2025)
- Scientific career
- Fields: Physics
- Workplaces: Collège de France; Yale University; University of California, Santa Barbara
- Thesis: Mise en évidence d'un ordre orientationnel de type vitreux dans l'hydrogène et le deutérium solides (1982)
- Doctoral advisor: Neil S. Sullivan
- Doctoral students: Vincent Bouchiat

Michel Henri Devoret (French: [miʃɛl dəvɔʁɛ]; born 5 March 1953) is a French–American physicist. He is Professor of Physics at the University of California, Santa Barbara, and Professor Emeritus of Applied Physics at Yale University. He serves as the Chief Scientist for Quantum Hardware at Google Quantum AI. He is known for the development of various superconducting quantum computing architectures, including the quantronium, the transmon, and the fluxonium.

Devoret shared the 2025 Nobel Prize in Physics with John Clarke and John M. Martinis for their joint work on macroscopic quantum phenomena in superconducting circuits.

== Early life and education ==
Michel Henri Devoret was born on 5 March 1953 in Paris. He has stated that his parents were of Jewish background, even though they were not religious.

Devoret trained as a telecommunications engineer at École nationale supérieure des télécommunications (now Télécom Paris), before receiving a degree in Quantum Optics in 1976 and a Doctor of Philosophy in Quantum Condensed Matter Physics in 1982, both from the University of Orsay (now Paris-Saclay University). He performed his doctoral research at CEA Saclay in the group of Anatole Abragam, under the supervision of Neil S. Sullivan.

== Career ==
Devoret worked as a postdoctoral researcher in John Clarke's group at the University of California, Berkeley, from 1982 to 1984. Together, with John M. Martinis, a graduate student at the time, they demonstrated for the first time the quantized energy levels of a Josephson junction in 1985.

Devoret then returned to France and founded the Quantronics group at the Orme des Merisiers laboratory of CEA Saclay together with Daniel Esteve and Cristian Urbina. The group measured the traversal time of tunnelling, invented an electron pump, observed the charge of Cooper pairs directly, and developed a type of qubit dubbed quantronium. They also observed the Ramsey fringes of quantronium.

In 1996, Devoret spent a research stay in the laboratory of Hans Mooij at Delft University of Technology.

Devoret became a professor at Yale University in 2002. At Yale University, Steven Girvin, Robert J. Schoelkopf, and Devoret devised a type of superconducting charge qubit called the transmon. In 2009, Devoret also pioneered fluxonium, which can be understood as a special type of flux qubit. In 2010, he also developed a microwave quantum limited amplifier for qubit readout and sensing.

He also participated in 2018 in an experiment demonstrating the interruption and reversal of quantum jumps in a superconducting artificial atom, providing new insights into the dynamics of quantum measurement.

From 2007 to 2012, Michel Devoret held the Chair of Mesoscopic Physics at the Collège de France where his inaugural lecture, "From the Atom to Quantum Machines," illustrated the connection between fundamental quantum phenomena and emerging quantum technologies. He resigned in 2013.

In 2023, he was named the Chief Scientist for Hardware at Google Quantum AI. In 2024, he moved to the University of California, Santa Barbara to serve as Professor of Physics.

== Recognition ==
=== Awards ===
Year	Organization	Award	Co-recipients	Citation	Ref.
1970	France	Prix de la Couronne française	—		
1991	French Academy of Sciences	Ampère Prize	Daniel Esteve	—	
1995	Royal Netherlands Academy of Arts and Sciences	Descartes–Huygens Prize	—	—	
2004	European Physical Society	EPS Europhysics Prize	Hans Mooij, Daniel Esteve, and Yasunobu Nakamura	"For the realisation and demonstration of the quantum bit concept based on superconducting circuits."	
2013	Centre for Quantum Information and Quantum Control	John Stewart Bell Prize	Robert J. Schoelkopf	—	
2014	Duke University	Fritz London Memorial Prize	John M. Martinis and Robert J. Schoelkopf	"In recognition of fundamental and pioneering experimental advances in quantum control, quantum information processing and quantum optics with superconducting qubits and microwave photons."	
2016	Aalto University	Olli V. Lounasmaa Memorial Prize	John M. Martinis and Robert J. Schoelkopf	"For his pioneering investigations and applications of macroscopic quantum phenomena at low temperatures."	
2021	Micius Quantum Foundation	Micius Quantum Prize	John Clarke and Yasunobu Nakamura	"For their leading roles in pioneering superconducting quantum circuits and qubits."	
2024	National Academy of Sciences	Comstock Prize in Physics	Robert J. Schoelkopf	—	
2025	Royal Swedish Academy of Sciences	Nobel Prize in Physics	John Clarke and John M. Martinis	"For the discovery of macroscopic quantum mechanical tunnelling and energy quantisation in an electric circuit."	

=== Memberships ===
Year	Organization	Type	Ref.
2003	American Academy of Arts and Sciences	Member	
2007	French Academy of Sciences	Member	
2023	National Academy of Sciences	Member	

=== Honors ===
Year	Country	Honor	Ref.
2008	France	Knight of the Legion of Honour	
