= Daniel Lidar =

American engineer and academic

- Born: Daniel Amihud Lidar; 1968 (age 57–58); Jerusalem
- Education: Hebrew University of Jerusalem
- Scientific career
- Fields: Electrical Engineering and Chemistry and Physics
- Workplaces: UC Berkeley; University of Toronto; University of Southern California
- Doctoral advisor: Robert Benny Gerber; Ofer Biham

Daniel Amihud Lidar (born 1968) is an American physicist who is the Viterbi Professor of Engineering at the University of Southern California, where he is a professor of electrical engineering, chemistry, physics & astronomy. He is the director and co-founder of the USC Center for Quantum Information Science & Technology (CQIST), the director of the USC-IBM Quantum Innovation Center, as well as scientific director of the USC-Lockheed Martin Quantum Computing Center, known for his research on control of quantum systems and quantum information processing.

== Education ==
Lidar is a 1986 graduate of the Armand Hammer United World College of the American West. He obtained his PhD from the Hebrew University of Jerusalem in 1997 under Robert Benny Gerber and Ofer Biham, with a thesis entitled Structural Characterization of Disordered Systems.

== Career ==
In 1997–2000, Lidar completed a postdoc at UC Berkeley. He was awarded a Rothschild Foundation in 1997. At Berkeley, he co-developed decoherence-free subspaces, a method of controlling quantum errors by exploiting particular symmetries to make a quantum system immune to certain kinds of noise.

In 2000, he became an assistant professor and later an associate professor of chemistry at the University of Toronto, with cross-appointments in physics and mathematics. His early career awards include a Sloan Foundation Fellowship, the Young Explorer Award given by the Canadian Institute for Advanced Research for the top 20 researchers in Canada under age 40, and the John Charles Polanyi Prize in Chemistry awarded by the Ontario Council of Graduate Studies. During this period, Lidar continued to work on decoherence-free subspaces and their generalization, noiseless subsystems.

Lidar moved to the University of Southern California in 2005, where he became a professor of electrical engineering and chemistry, with a cross appointment in physics. In 2007 he was named a Fellow of the American Physical Society, and was listed as one of the top 20 authors of the decade 2000–2009 in Quantum Computing by Thomson Reuters' Sciencewatch. He was a 2017 Guggenheim Fellowship recipient, a 2012 Fellow of the American Association for the Advancement of Science, and 2015 Fellow of the IEEE.

In 2011, Lidar became the scientific directer of the newly established USC-Lockheed Martin Quantum Computing Center, which became the first organization outside of D-Wave to host and operate a quantum annealing system, in this case D-Wave One. During this period Lidar also co-edited the Cambridge Quantum Error Correction textbook, together with Todd Brun.

Lidar is the founding and current director of the USC Center for Quantum Information Science and Technology and, in 2024, became the director of the IBM Quantum Innovation Center.

== Research ==
Lidar has made numerous contributions to the theory of open quantum systems, quantum computing and quantum control. Lidar has also worked on quantum algorithms, having written some of the pioneering papers in the subject on simulation of classical statistical mechanics and quantum chemistry. His past interests include scattering theory and fractals. In his PhD work he made a widely cited observation on the limited scaling range of empirically observed fractals, which led to an exchange with Benoit Mandelbrot.

=== Decoherence-free subspaces ===
Lidar's research in quantum information processing has focused primarily on methods for overcoming decoherence. He wrote many of the founding papers on decoherence-free subspaces, most notably his widely cited paper "Decoherence-free subspaces for quantum computation", and their generalization, noiseless subsystems. He helped to show universal fault tolerant computation was possible in a DFS.

More recently, Lidar's group has demonstrated DFS logical qubits in superconducting qubits.

=== Dynamical decoupling ===
Lidar has made major contributions to dynamical decoupling, in particular the invention of the concatenated dynamical decoupling (CDD) method, a way to construct higher-order DD sequences by recursively inserting lower order DD sequences into time delays of a previous level sequence. He has made a proposal to protect adiabatic quantum computation against decoherence using dynamical decoupling, one of the only proposals to date dealing with error correction for the adiabatic model.

=== Quantum annealing and adiabatic quantum computing ===
Lidar has made widely cited contributions to adiabatic quantum computing and quantum annealing, and has in particular spent considerable time characterizing the capabilities of the D-Wave Systems processors.

=== Quantum computing with noisy hardware ===
Through work with IBM's cloud computers, Lidar demonstrated the first example of algorithmic quantum speedup using IBM's quantum computers and dynamical decoupling.

== Patents ==
He holds six U.S. patents in the areas of quantum computing and optimization.

== Publications ==
- Quantum Aspects of Life (book), 2008, section co-author
- "Attack of the quantum worms", New Scientist, October 29, 2005, pp. 30–33
- "Single field shapes quantum bits", Technology Research News, November 3/10, 2004
- "Sturdy quantum computing demoed", Technology Research News, April 7/14, 2004
- "World Computations", Lifestyles Magazine Vol. 31, No. 182, 2002, pp. 38–40 (an interview)
- "Quantum Protection", NSERC Newsbureau Bulletin No. 46, published April 25, 2002
- "A quantum leap in the way computers think", Toronto Star, March 28, 2002, National Report section
- "Alternative quantum bits go natural", Technology Research News, April 2001
- "Quantum Computers", Chemical & Engineering News cover story, November 2000
- "Haven for Quantum Computation", Science, Editor's Choice, September 2000
- "Quantum Computing for Chemists", New Scientist, August 1998
