= 1QBit =

Quantum computing software company based in Vancouver

1QB Information Technologies Inc.
- Type: Privately held company
- Industry: Software
- Founded: December 1, 2012
- Headquarters: Vancouver, British Columbia, Canada
- Key people: Andrew Fursman; Landon Downs
- Products: 1Qloud; QEMIST; xrAI
- Number of employees: 100 (2019)
- Website: www.1qbit.com

1QB Information Technologies, Inc. (1QBit) is a quantum computing software company, based in Vancouver, British Columbia. 1QBit was founded on December 1, 2012 and has established hardware partnerships with Microsoft, IBM, Fujitsu and D-Wave Systems. While 1QBit develops general purpose algorithms for quantum computing hardware, the organization is primarily focused on computational finance, materials science, quantum chemistry, and the life sciences.

== Technology ==
1QBit has divisions focused on universal quantum computing, advanced AI techniques, cloud based quantum processing, and hardware innovation.

1QBit's 1Qloud platform is focused on optimization including reformulating optimization problems into the quadratic unconstrained binary optimization (QUBO) format necessary to compute with quantum annealing processors and similar devices from organizations such as Fujitsu, D-Wave, Hitachi and NTT.

== History ==
1QBit was founded as the first dedicated quantum computing software company in 2012. In 2013, 1QBit raised seed funding from US and Canadian angel investors, before closing a Series A financing round led by the Chicago Mercantile Exchange in 2014.

On August 5, 2015, the World Economic Forum announced 1QBit as a recipient of the 2015 Technology Pioneer Award recognizing 1QBit as a leader among the world's most promising technology companies. In 2017, 1QBit raised a $45M Series B financing round led by Fujitsu with participation from Allianz, Accenture, The Royal Bank of Scotland and the Chicago Mercantile Exchange. In April 2018, 1QBit joined the IBM Q Network, a global community of Fortune 500 companies, academic institutions, startups, and national research labs designed to explore practical applications for quantum computing.

In May 2020, 1QBit and its collaborators serving health authorities from East to West obtained support from the Digital Technology Supercluster to facilitate the clinical implementation of XrAI, the first Artificial Intelligence (AI) radiology platform to be accredited by Health Canada as a Class III Medical Device.

== Locations ==
1QBit is headquartered in Vancouver, British Columbia, Canada. In early 2019, 1QBit opened a hardware innovation lab at the University of Waterloo in Waterloo, Ontario.

== See also ==
- Adiabatic quantum computation
- Quantum computing
- Quantum simulator
- Timeline of quantum computing and communication
