= D-Wave =

D-wave may refer to:

- D-Wave Systems, a quantum computing company
  - D-Wave Two, a quantum computer
- D wave, an electronic wave function of the d atomic orbital
