= William D. Oliver =

American electrical engineer

- Alma mater: University of Rochester (BS, BA); Massachusetts Institute of Technology (SM); Stanford University (PhD)
- Known for: Quantum engineering, extensible fabrication and 3D integration of superconducting quantum systems
- Awards: Fellow of the American Physical Society (2016); Fellow of the American Association for the Advancement of Science (2023); Fellow of the Institute of Electrical and Electronics Engineers (2025)
- Scientific career
- Fields: Physics, electrical engineering
- Workplaces: Massachusetts Institute of Technology; Google Quantum AI; Atlantic Quantum; MIT Lincoln Laboratory
- Doctoral advisor: Yoshihisa Yamamoto
- Website: equs.mit.edu

William D. Oliver is an American physicist and electrical engineer. He is the Henry Ellis Warren (1894) Professor of Electrical Engineering and Computer Science and a professor of physics at the Massachusetts Institute of Technology (MIT), director of the MIT Center for Quantum Engineering, and associate director of the Research Laboratory of Electronics (RLE). His research focuses on superconducting qubits and on cryogenic control electronics for quantum and classical high-performance computing.

== Early life and education ==
Oliver was raised in New York's Finger Lakes region and studied first at the State University of New York at Fredonia, then at the University of Rochester. At Rochester he received a B.S. in electrical engineering and a B.A. in Japanese in 1995. He earned an S.M. in electrical engineering and computer science from MIT in 1997, working with Tod Machover at the MIT Media Lab, and a Ph.D. in electrical engineering, with a minor in physics, from Stanford University in 2003 supervised by Yoshihisa Yamamoto.

== Career ==
Oliver joined MIT Lincoln Laboratory in 2003 as a member of its Quantum Information and Integrated Nanosystems Group. He became a principal investigator at RLE in 2006 and later led its Engineering Quantum Systems Group, which he founded in 2015. He was a JSPS Visiting Researcher in 2013, and the MIT Department of Physics appointed him Professor of the Practice in July 2015. Lincoln Laboratory named him a Fellow in 2017. He was also appointed associate director of RLE, where he leads quantum information science research and is the liaison between RLE and Lincoln Laboratory.

MIT promoted Oliver to Professor of Electrical Engineering and Computer Science and of Physics in 2021 and named him the Henry Ellis Warren (1894) Professor. He is the founding director of the MIT Center for Quantum Engineering and holds Lincoln Laboratory Fellow Emeritus status.

Oliver was a co-author of the 2019 National Academies of Sciences, Engineering, and Medicine consensus study report Quantum Computing: Progress and Prospects. He is a member of the U.S. National Quantum Initiative Advisory Committee and the U.S. Committee for Superconducting Electronics.

Oliver and several current and former members of the Engineering Quantum Systems Group founded Atlantic Quantum in 2022 to develop superconducting quantum-computing hardware. The company raised a $9 million seed round led by The Engine and was acquired by Google Quantum AI in October 2025. In a 2026 Scientific American feature on the state of the field, Oliver estimated that larger-scale quantum computers could arrive in about 20 years.

== Research ==
Oliver's group makes and measures superconducting qubits, with work that runs from the materials and fabrication of the devices to small quantum processors built from them. The other part of his research is low-temperature hardware: cryogenic packaging, and control electronics made with CMOS and single-flux-quantum logic.

His group studies the coherence of superconducting flux and fluxonium qubits. A 2016 paper in Nature Communications described a redesigned flux qubit with improved coherence and more reproducible fabrication. A separate 2016 study in Science showed that qubit relaxation could be suppressed by quasiparticle pumping.

== Awards and honors ==
- Fellow, American Physical Society (2016), "for pioneering contributions to the physics and associated engineering of robust, reproducible, superconducting quantum systems and high-performance cryogenic control electronics"
- Thornton Family Faculty Research and Innovation Fellowship, MIT (2021)
- Fellow, American Association for the Advancement of Science (2023)
- Fellow, Institute of Electrical and Electronics Engineers (2025)

== Selected publications ==
- Yan, F.; Gustavsson, S.; Kamal, A.; et al. (2016). "The flux qubit revisited to enhance coherence and reproducibility". Nature Communications. 7 12964. arXiv:1508.06299. Bibcode:2016NatCo...712964Y. doi:10.1038/ncomms12964. PMC 5097147. PMID 27808092.
- Gustavsson, S.; Yan, F.; Catelani, G.; et al. (2016). "Suppressing relaxation in superconducting qubits by quasiparticle pumping". Science. 354 (6319): 1573–1577. arXiv:1612.08462. Bibcode:2016Sci...354.1573G. doi:10.1126/science.aah5844. PMID 27940578.
- National Academies of Sciences, Engineering, and Medicine (2019). Quantum Computing: Progress and Prospects. Washington, DC: The National Academies Press. doi:10.17226/25196
