= Hartmut Neven =

German scientist

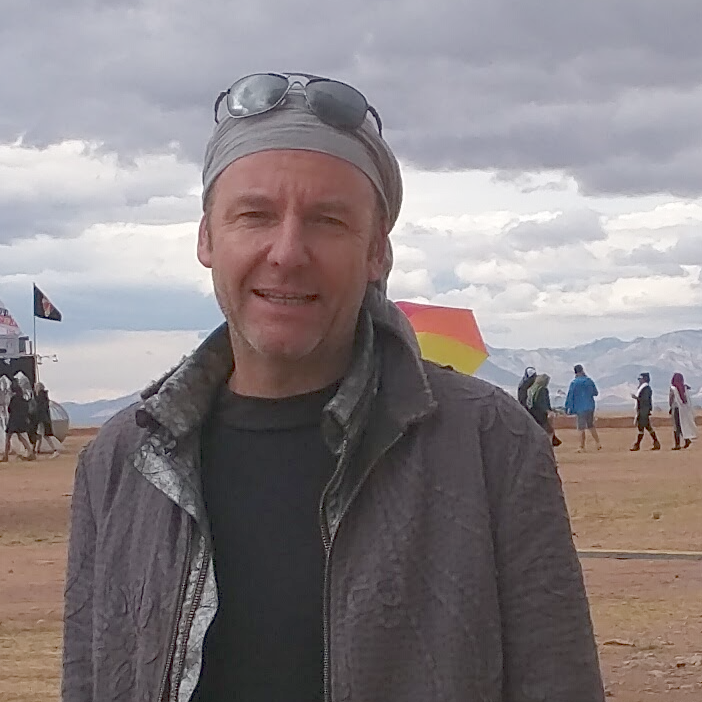
- Neven at Further Future 2016
- Born: 1964 (age 61–62); Aachen, Germany
- Scientific career
- Fields: Physics, Computer Science, Neuroscience
- Doctoral advisor: Christoph von der Malsburg

Hartmut Neven (born 1964) is a German-American physicist, computer scientist and entrepreneur working in quantum computing, computer vision, robotics and computational neuroscience. He is best known for his work in face and object recognition and his contributions to quantum machine learning. He is currently Vice President of Engineering at Google where he leads the Quantum Artificial Intelligence Lab, which he founded in 2012.

== Education ==
Hartmut Neven studied Physics and Economics in Brazil, Köln, Paris, Tübingen and Jerusalem. He wrote his Master thesis on a neuronal model of object recognition at the Max Planck Institute for Biological Cybernetics under Valentino Braitenberg. In 1996 he received his Ph.D. in Physics from the Institute for Neuroinformatics at the Ruhr University in Bochum, Germany, for a thesis on "Dynamics for vision-guided autonomous mobile robots" written under the tutelage of Christoph von der Malsburg. He received a scholarship from the Studienstiftung des Deutschen Volkes, Germany's most prestigious scholarship foundation.

== Work ==
In 1998 Neven became research professor of computer science at the University of Southern California at the Laboratory for Biological and Computational Vision. In 2003 he returned as the head of the Laboratory for Human-Machine Interfaces at USC's Information Sciences Institute.

=== Computer vision and machine learning ===
==== Face recognition, avatars and face filters ====
Neven co-founded two companies, Eyematic for which he served as CTO and Neven Vision which he initially led as CEO. At Eyematic he developed face recognition technology and real-time facial feature analysis for avatar animation. Teams led by Neven have repeatedly won top scores in government sponsored tests designed to determine the most accurate face recognition software. Face filters, now ubiquitous on mobile phones, were launched for the first time by Neven Vision on the networks of NTT DoCoMo and Vodafone Japan in 2003. Neven Vision also pioneered mobile visual search for camera phones. Neven Vision was acquired by Google in 2006.

==== Object recognition and adversarial images ====
At Google he managed teams responsible for advancing Google's visual search technologies. His team launched Google Goggles now Google Lens. The concept of adversarial patterns originated in his group when he tasked Christian Szegedy with a project to modify the pixel inputs of a deep neural network to lower the activity of select output nodes. The motivation was to use this technique for object localization which did not work out. But the idea gave rise to the fields of adversarial learning and DeepDream art. In 2013 his optical character recognition team won the ICDAR Robust Reading Competition by a wide margin and in 2014 the object recognition team won the ImageNet challenge.

==== Google Glass ====
Neven was a co-founder of the Google Glass project. His team completed the first prototype, codenamed Ant, in 2011.

=== Quantum artificial intelligence ===
In 2006 Neven started to explore the application of quantum computing to hard combinatorial problems arising in machine learning. In collaboration with D-Wave Systems he developed the first image recognition system based on quantum algorithms. It was demonstrated at SuperComputing07. At NIPS 2009 his team demonstrated the first binary classifier trained on a quantum processor.

In 2012 together with Pete Worden at NASA Ames he founded the Quantum Artificial Intelligence Laboratory. In 2014 he invited John M. Martinis and his group at UC Santa Barbara to join the lab to start a fabrication facility for superconducting quantum processors. The Quantum Artificial Intelligence team performed the first experimental demonstration of a scalable simulation of a molecule.

In 2016 the team formulated an experiment to demonstrate quantum supremacy. Quantum supremacy was then declared by Google in October 2019.

In 2023 Quantum AI researchers demonstrated that quantum error correction works in practice by showing for the first time that the error of a logical qubit decreases when increasing the number of physical qubits it is composed of.

Google's quantum processors have been used to study the physics of quantum many body states that otherwise are challenging to prepare in a laboratory such as time crystals, traversable wormholes and non-Abelian anyons.

In 2024, Google Quantum AI unveiled the Willow processor, a 105-qubit superconducting quantum chip. With Willow, the team realized a milestone in quantum error correction by achieving performance well below the surface code threshold, demonstrating that errors can be suppressed exponentially as the number of qubits is scaled. On the random circuit sampling benchmark, Willow completed the task in five minutes, running 10^{25} times faster than the world's fastest classical supercomputer.

Subsequently, in 2025, the team demonstrated the first verifiable quantum advantage utilizing the "Quantum Echoes" algorithm. Executed on the Willow processor, the algorithm computes out-of-time-ordered correlators (OTOC) to measure quantum dynamics and many-body interference. The computational task was completed approximately 13,000 times faster than the fastest known classical algorithm on the Frontier supercomputer, marking a step toward practical applications such as modeling molecular structures in nuclear magnetic resonance (NMR) spectroscopy.

In 2026, Neven co-authored "Quantum + AI = Quantum AI" with Caltech physicist Maria Spiropulu arguing that quantum computing and artificial intelligence will coverge into "Quantum AI," a term they present for AI systems with access to quantum computational resources. They suggest then that these systems could generate training data impractical to obtain classically and learn from quantum sensor data with fewer training examples thus reducing computational and energy costs of training large machine-learning models. They predict that this will occur within the first hundred years of AI.

==== Neven's law ====
Neven's law states that the performance of quantum computers improves at a doubly exponential rate.

== Awards and honors ==
- TIME100 AI (2025): Named by TIME magazine as one of the 100 most influential individuals globally in the field of artificial intelligence for his work converging quantum computing and machine learning.
- Doctor Honoris Causa (2025): Awarded an honorary doctorate by the University of Coimbra in Portugal, recognizing his global scientific merit and leadership in establishing modern quantum computing initiatives.
- Vienna Gödel Lecture (2025): Selected by TU Wien Informatics to deliver the Gödel Lecture, focusing on breakthroughs at the intersection of AI and quantum mechanics.
- Physics World Breakthrough of the Year (2024): Co-awarded to Neven and the Google Quantum AI team for implementing quantum error correction below the surface code threshold using the Willow processor.
- Most Creative People (2020): Recognized by Fast Company magazine as one of the world's Most Creative People in Business for his pioneering work spanning computer vision to quantum algorithms.
