= Decoherence-free subspaces =

Subspace of a quantum system's Hilbert space that is invariant to non-unitary dynamics

A decoherence-free subspace (DFS) is a subspace of a quantum system's Hilbert space that is invariant to non-unitary dynamics. Alternatively stated, they are a small section of the system Hilbert space where the system is decoupled from the environment and thus its evolution is completely unitary. DFSs can also be characterized as a special class of quantum error correcting codes. In this representation they are passive error-preventing codes since these subspaces are encoded with information that (possibly) won't require any active stabilization methods. These subspaces prevent destructive environmental interactions by isolating quantum information. As such, they are an important subject in quantum computing, where (coherent) control of quantum systems is the desired goal. Decoherence creates problems in this regard by causing loss of coherence between the quantum states of a system and therefore the decay of their interference terms, thus leading to loss of information from the (open) quantum system to the surrounding environment. Since quantum computers cannot be isolated from their environment (i.e. we cannot have a truly isolated quantum system in the real world) and information can be lost, the study of DFSs is important for the implementation of quantum computers into the real world.

== Background ==
=== Origins ===
The study of DFSs began with a search for structured methods to avoid decoherence in the subject of quantum information processing (QIP). The methods involved attempts to identify particular states which have the potential of being unchanged by certain decohering processes (i.e. certain interactions with the environment). These studies started with observations made by G.M. Palma, K-A Suominen, and A.K. Ekert, who studied the consequences of pure dephasing on two qubits that have the same interaction with the environment. They found that two such qubits do not decohere. Originally the term "sub-decoherence" was used by Palma to describe this situation. Noteworthy is also independent work by Martin Plenio, Vlatko Vedral and Peter Knight who constructed an error correcting code with codewords that are invariant under a particular unitary time evolution in spontaneous emission.

=== Further development ===
Shortly afterwards, L-M Duan and G-C Guo also studied this phenomenon and reached the same conclusions as Palma, Suominen, and Ekert. However, Duan and Guo applied their own terminology, using "coherence preserving states" to describe states that do not decohere with dephasing. Duan and Guo furthered this idea of combining two qubits to preserve coherence against dephasing, to both collective dephasing and dissipation showing that decoherence is prevented in such a situation. This was shown by assuming knowledge of the system-environment coupling strength. However, such models were limited since they dealt with the decoherence processes of dephasing and dissipation solely. To deal with other types of decoherences, the previous models presented by Palma, Suominen, and Ekert, and Duan and Guo were cast into a more general setting by P. Zanardi and M. Rasetti. They expanded the existing mathematical framework to include more general system-environment interactions, such as collective decoherence-the same decoherence process acting on all the states of a quantum system and general Hamiltonians. Their analysis gave the first formal and general circumstances for the existence of decoherence-free (DF) states, which did not rely upon knowing the system-environment coupling strength. Zanardi and Rasetti called these DF states "error avoiding codes". Subsequently, Daniel A. Lidar proposed the title "decoherence-free subspace" for the space in which these DF states exist. Lidar studied the strength of DF states against perturbations and discovered that the coherence prevalent in DF states can be upset by evolution of the system Hamiltonian. This observation discerned another prerequisite for the possible use of DF states for quantum computation. A thoroughly general requirement for the existence of DF states was obtained by Lidar, D. Bacon, and K.B. Whaley expressed in terms of the Kraus operator-sum representation (OSR). Later, A. Shabani and Lidar generalized the DFS framework relaxing the requirement that the initial state needs to be a DF-state and modified some known conditions for DFS.

=== Recent research ===
A subsequent development was made in generalizing the DFS picture when E. Knill, R. Laflamme, and L. Viola introduced the concept of a "noiseless subsystem". Knill extended to higher-dimensional irreducible representations of the algebra generating the dynamical symmetry in the system-environment interaction. Earlier work on DFSs described DF states as singlets, which are one-dimensional irreducible representations. This work proved to be successful, as a result of this analysis was the lowering of the number of qubits required to build a DFS under collective decoherence from four to three. The generalization from subspaces to subsystems formed a foundation for combining most known decoherence prevention and nulling strategies.

== Conditions for the existence of decoherence-free subspaces ==
=== Hamiltonian formulation ===
Consider an N-dimensional quantum system S coupled to a bath B and described by the combined system-bath Hamiltonian as follows:
$$\hat{H} = \hat{H}_{S}\otimes\hat{I}_{B} + \hat{I}_{S}\otimes\hat{H}_{B} + \hat{H}_{I},$$
where the interaction Hamiltonian $\hat{H}_{I}$ is given in the usual way as
$$\hat{H}_{I} = \sum_{i}\hat{S}_{i}\otimes\hat{B}_{i},$$
and where $\hat{S}_{i}\big(\hat{B}_{i}\big)$ act upon the system (bath) only, and $\hat{H}_{S} \big(\hat{H}_{B}\big)$ is the system (bath) Hamiltonian, and $\hat{I}_{S}\big(\hat{I}_{B}\big)$ is the identity operator acting on the system (bath). Under these conditions, the dynamical evolution within $\tilde{\mathcal{H}}_{S}\subset\mathcal{H}_{S}$, where $\mathcal{H}_{S}$ is the system Hilbert space, is completely unitary $\forall|\phi\rangle$ (all possible bath states) if and only if:

1. $\hat{S}_{i}|\phi\rangle = s_{i}|\phi\rangle, s_{i}\in\mathbb{C}$ for all $|\phi\rangle$ that span $\mathcal{\tilde{H}}_{S}$ and $\forall\hat{S}_{i}\in\mathcal{O}_{SB}(\mathcal{H}_{SB})$, the space of bounded system-bath operators on $\mathcal{H}_{SB}$,
2. the system and bath are not coupled at first (i.e. they can be represented as a product state),
3. there is no "leakage" of states out of $\mathcal{\tilde{H}}_{S}$; that is, the system Hamiltonian $\hat{H}_{S}$ does not map the states $|\phi\rangle$ out of $\mathcal{\tilde{H}}_{S}$.

In other words, if the system begins in $\mathcal{\tilde{H}}_{S}$ (i.e. the system and bath are initially decoupled) and the system Hamiltonian $\hat{H}_{S}$ leaves $\mathcal{\tilde{H}}_{S} = \operatorname{span}\left[\left\{|\phi_{k}\rangle\right\}_{k=1}^{N}\right]$ invariant, then $\mathcal{\tilde{H}}_{S}$ is a DFS if and only if it satisfies (i).

These states are degenerate eigenkets of $\hat{S}_{i}\in\mathcal{O}_{SB}(\mathcal{H}_{SB})$ and thus are distinguishable, hence preserving information in certain decohering processes. Any subspace of the system Hilbert space that satisfies the above conditions is a decoherence-free subspace. However, information can still "leak" out of this subspace if condition (iii) is not satisfied. Therefore, even if a DFS exists under the Hamiltonian conditions, there are still non-unitary actions that can act upon these subspaces and take states out of them into another subspace, which may or may not be a DFS, of the system Hilbert space.

==== Operator-sum representation formulation ====
Let $\mathcal{\tilde{H}}_{S}\subset\mathcal{H}_{S}$ be an N-dimensional DFS, where $\mathcal{H}_{S}$ is the system's (the quantum system alone) Hilbert space. The Kraus operators when written in terms of the N basis states that span $\mathcal{H}_{S}$ are given as:
$$\mathbf{A}_{l} = \begin{pmatrix}
g_{l}\mathbf{\tilde{U}} & \mathbf{0} \\
\mathbf{0} & \mathbf{\bar{A}}_{l}
\end{pmatrix}, \quad
g_{l} = \sqrt{a_{j}}\langle k|\mathbf{U}_{C}|j\rangle$$
where $\mathbf{U}_{C} = \exp\left({-i\mathbf{H}_{C}t}/{\hbar}\right)$ ($\mathbf{H}_{C}$ is the combined system-bath Hamiltonian), $\mathbf{\tilde{U}}$ acts on $\mathcal{\tilde{H}}_{S}\subset\mathcal{H}_{S}$, and $\mathbf{\bar{A}}_{l}$ is an arbitrary matrix that acts on $\mathcal{\tilde{H}^{\bot}}_{S}$ (the orthogonal complement to $\mathcal{\tilde{H}}_{S}$). Since $\mathbf{\bar{A}}_{l}$ operates on $\mathcal{\tilde{H}^{\bot}}_{S}$, then it will not create decoherence in $\mathcal{\tilde{H}}_{S}$; however, it can (possibly) create decohering effects in $\mathcal{\tilde{H}^{\bot}}_{S}$. Consider the basis kets $\left\{|j\rangle\right\}_{j=1}^{N}$ which span $\mathcal{\tilde{H}}_{S}$ and, furthermore, they fulfill:
$$\mathbf{\bar{A}}_{l}|j\rangle = g_{l}\mathbf{\tilde{U}}|j\rangle,\quad \forall{l}.$$

$\mathbf{\tilde{U}}$ is an arbitrary unitary operator and may or may not be time-dependent, but it is independent of the indexing variable $l$. The $g_{l}$'s are complex constants. Since $\left\{|j\rangle\right\}_{j=1}^{N}$ spans $\mathcal{\tilde{H}}_{S}$, then any pure state $|\psi\rangle\in\mathcal{\tilde{H}}_{S}$ can be written as a linear combination of these basis kets:
$$|\psi\rangle = \sum_{j=1}^{N}b_{j}|j\rangle,\quad b_{j}\in\mathbb{C}.$$

This state will be decoherence-free; this can be seen by considering the action of $\mathbf{\bar{A}}_{l}$ on $|\psi\rangle$:
$$\begin{align}
\mathbf{\bar{A}}_{l}|\psi\rangle &= \sum_{j=1}^{N}b_{j}(\mathbf{\bar{A}}_{l}|j\rangle) \\
&= \sum_{j=1}^{N}b_{j}(g_{l}\mathbf{\tilde{U}}|j\rangle) \\
\mathbf{\bar{A}}_{l}|\psi\rangle &= g_{l} \mathbf{\tilde{U}}|\psi\rangle.
\end{align}$$

Therefore, in terms of the density operator representation of $|\psi\rangle$, $\rho_\text{initial} = |\psi\rangle \langle\psi|$, the evolution of this state is:
$$\begin{align}
\rho_\text{final}
&= \sum_{l} \mathbf{A}_{l}\rho_\text{initial}\mathbf{A}^{\dagger}_{l}\\
&= \sum_{l} g_{l}\mathbf{\tilde{U}}|\psi\rangle\langle\psi|h_{l}\mathbf{\tilde{U}}^{\dagger} \\
&= \mathbf{\tilde{U}}|\psi\rangle\langle\psi|\mathbf{\tilde{U}}^{\dagger}.
\end{align}$$

The above expression says that $\rho_\text{final}$ is a pure state and that its evolution is unitary, since $\mathbf{\tilde{U}}$ is unitary. Therefore, any state in $\mathcal{\tilde{H}}_{S}$ will not decohere since its evolution is governed by a unitary operator and so its dynamical evolution will be completely unitary. Thus $\mathcal{\tilde{H}}_{S}$ is a decoherence-free subspace. The above argument can be generalized to an initial arbitrary mixed state as well.

==== Semigroup formulation ====
This formulation makes use of the semigroup approach. The Lindblad decohering term determines when the dynamics of a quantum system will be unitary; in particular, when $L_{D}[\rho] = 0$, where $\rho$ is the density operator representation of the state of the system, the dynamics will be decoherence-free. Let $\left\{|j\rangle\right\}_{j=1}^{N}$ span $\mathcal{\tilde{H}}_{S}\subset\mathcal{H}_{S}$, where $\mathcal{H}_{S}$ is the system's Hilbert space. Under the assumptions that:

1. the noise parameters of the coefficient matrix of the Lindblad decohering term are not fine-tuned (i.e. no special assumptions are made about them)
2. there is no dependence on the initial conditions of the initial state of the system

a necessary and sufficient condition for $\mathcal{\tilde{H}}_{S}$ to be a DFS is $\forall{|j\rangle}$:
$$\mathbf{F}_{\alpha}|j\rangle = \lambda_{\alpha}|j\rangle,\quad\forall\alpha.$$

The above expression states that all basis states $|j\rangle$ are degenerate eigenstates of the error generators $\left\{\mathbf{F}_{\alpha}\right\}_{\alpha=1}^{M=N\times{N}}.$ As such, their respective coherence terms do not decohere. Thus states within $\mathcal{\tilde{H}}_{S}$ will remain mutually distinguishable after a decohering process since their respective eigenvalues are degenerate and hence identifiable after action under the error generators.

== DFSs as a special class of information-preserving structures (IPS) and quantum error-correcting codes (QECCs) ==
=== Information-preserving structures (IPS) ===
DFSs can be thought of as "encoding" information through its set of states. To see this, consider a d-dimensional open quantum system that is prepared in the state $\boldsymbol{\rho}$ - a non-negative (i.e. its eigenvalues are positive), trace-normalized ($\operatorname{Tr}[\rho] = 1$), $d\times d$ density operator that belongs to the system's Hilbert–Schmidt space, the space of bounded operators on $\mathcal{H}$ ($\mathcal{B(\mathcal{H})}$). Suppose that this density operator(state) is selected from a set of states $S = \left\{\rho_{i}\right\}_{i=1}^{n} \in \mathcal{\tilde{H}}_{S}$, a DFS of $\mathcal{H}_{S}$ (the system's Hilbert space) and where $n < d$. This set of states is called a code, because the states within this set encode particular kind of information; that is, the set S encodes information through its states. This information that is contained within $S$ must be able to be accessed; since the information is encoded in the states in $S$, these states must be distinguishable to some process, $\boldsymbol{\zeta}$ say, that attempts to acquire the information. Therefore, for two states $\boldsymbol{\rho}_{i},\boldsymbol{\rho}_{j} \in S, \; (i\ne j)$, the process $\boldsymbol{\zeta}$ is information preserving for these states if the states $\boldsymbol{\rho}_{i},\boldsymbol{\rho}_{j}$ remain as distinguishable after the process as they were before it. Stated in a more general manner, a code $S$ (or DFS) is preserved by a process $\boldsymbol{\zeta}$ if and only if each pair of states $\boldsymbol{\rho}_{i},\boldsymbol{\rho}_{j} \in S$ is as distinguishable after $\boldsymbol{\zeta}$ is applied as they were before it was applied. A more practical description would be: $S$ is preserved by a process $\boldsymbol{\zeta}$ if and only if $\forall \boldsymbol\rho,\boldsymbol\rho' \in S$ and $x \in \R^+$
$$\big\|\boldsymbol{\zeta}\big(\boldsymbol\rho - x \boldsymbol\rho'\big)\big\|_{1} = \big\|\boldsymbol\rho - x\boldsymbol\rho'\big\|_{1}.$$

This just says that $\boldsymbol{\zeta}$ is a 1:1 trace-distance-preserving map on $S$. In this picture DFSs are sets of states (codes rather) whose mutual distinguishability is unaffected by a process $\boldsymbol{\zeta}$.

=== Quantum error-correcting codes (QECCs) ===
Since DFSs can encode information through their sets of states, then they are secure against errors (decohering processes). In this way DFSs can be looked at as a special class of QECCs, where information is encoded into states which can be disturbed by an interaction with the environment but retrieved by some reversal process.

Consider a code $C = \operatorname{span}\left[\left\{|j_{k}\rangle\right\}\right]$, which is a subspace of the system Hilbert space, with encoded information given by $\left\{|j_{k}\rangle\right\}$ (i.e. the "codewords"). This code can be implemented to protect against decoherence and thus prevent loss of information in a small section of the system's Hilbert space. The errors are caused by interaction of the system with the environment (bath) and are represented by the Kraus operators. After the system has interacted with the bath, the information contained within $C$ must be able to be "decoded"; therefore, to retrieve this information a recovery operator $\mathbf{R}$ is introduced. So a QECC is a subspace $C$ along with a set of recovery operators $\left\{\mathbf{R}_{r}\right\}.$

Let $C$ be a QECC for the error operators represented by the Kraus operators $\left\{\mathbf{A}_{l}\right\}$, with recovery operators $\left\{\mathbf{R}_{r}\right\}.$ Then $C$ is a DFS if and only if upon restriction to $C$, then $\mathbf{R}_{r}\propto\mathbf{\tilde{U}}_{S}^{\dagger}, \forall{r}$, where $\mathbf{\tilde{U}}_{S}^{\dagger}$ is the inverse of the system evolution operator.

In this picture of reversal of quantum operations, DFSs are a special instance of the more general QECCs whereupon restriction to a given a code, the recovery operators become proportional to the inverse of the system evolution operator, hence allowing for unitary evolution of the system.

Notice that the subtle difference between these two formulations exists in the two words preserving and correcting; in the former case, error-prevention is the method used whereas in the latter case it is error-correction. Thus the two formulations differ in that one is a passive method and the other is an active method.

== Example of a decoherence-free subspace ==
=== Collective dephasing ===
Consider a two-qubit Hilbert space, spanned by the basis qubits $\left\{ |0\rangle_{1} \otimes |0\rangle_{2}, |0\rangle_{1} \otimes |1\rangle_{2}, |1\rangle_{1} \otimes |0\rangle_{2}, |1\rangle_{1} \otimes |1\rangle_{2} \right\}$ which undergo collective dephasing. A random phase $\phi$ will be created between these basis qubits; therefore, the qubits will transform in the following way:

$$\begin{align}|0\rangle_{1}\otimes|0\rangle_{2} & \longrightarrow |0\rangle_{1}\otimes|0\rangle_{2} \\
|0\rangle_{1}\otimes|1\rangle_{2} & \longrightarrow e^{i\phi}|0\rangle_{1}\otimes|1\rangle_{2} \\
|1\rangle_{1}\otimes|0\rangle_{2} & \longrightarrow e^{i\phi}|1\rangle_{1}\otimes|0\rangle_{2} \\
|1\rangle_{1}\otimes|1\rangle_{2} & \longrightarrow e^{2i\phi}|1\rangle_{1}\otimes|1\rangle_{2}.
\end{align}$$

Under this transformation the basis states $|0\rangle_{1}\otimes|1\rangle_{2}, |1\rangle_{1}\otimes|0\rangle_{2}$ obtain the same phase factor $e^{i\phi}$. Thus in consideration of this, a state $|\psi\rangle$ can be encoded with this information (i.e. the phase factor) and thus evolve unitarily under this dephasing process, by defining the following encoded qubits:

$$\begin{align}
|0_{E}\rangle &= |0\rangle_{1}\otimes|1\rangle_{2} \\
|1_{E}\rangle &= |1\rangle_{1}\otimes|0\rangle_{2}.
\end{align}$$

Since these are basis qubits, then any state can be written as a linear combination of these states; therefore,
$$|\psi_{E}\rangle = l|0_{E}\rangle + m|1_{E}\rangle,\quad l,m\in\mathbb{C}.$$

This state will evolve under the dephasing process as:
$$|\psi_{E}\rangle\longrightarrow l|0\rangle_{1}\otimes e^{i\phi}|1\rangle_{2} + e^{i\phi}m|1\rangle_{1}\otimes|0\rangle_{2} = e^{i\phi}|\psi_{E}\rangle.$$

However, the overall phase for a quantum state is unobservable and, as such, is irrelevant in the description of the state. Therefore, $|\psi_{E}\rangle$ remains invariant under this dephasing process and hence the basis set $\big\{|0\rangle_{1}\otimes|1\rangle_{2}, |1\rangle_{1}\otimes|0\rangle_{2}\big\}$ is a decoherence-free subspace of the 4-dimensional Hilbert space. Similarly, the subspaces $\big\{|0\rangle_{1}\otimes|0\rangle_{2}\big\}, \big\{|1\rangle_{1}\otimes |1\rangle_{2}\big\}$ are also DFSs.

== Alternative: decoherence-free subsystems ==
Consider a quantum system with an N-dimensional system Hilbert space $\mathcal{H}_{C}$ that has a general subsystem decomposition $\mathcal{H}_{C} = \bigoplus_{j=1}^{N}(\bigotimes_{i=1}^{l_{N}}\mathcal{H}_{ji}).$ The subsystem $\mathcal{H}_{ji}$ is a decoherence-free subsystem with respect to a system-environment coupling if every pure state in $\mathcal{H}_{ji}$ remains unchanged with respect to this subsystem under the OSR evolution. This is true for any possible initial condition of the environment. To understand the difference between a decoherence-free subspace and a decoherence-free subsystem, consider encoding a single qubit of information into a two-qubit system. This two-qubit system has a 4-dimensional Hilbert space; one method of encoding a single qubit into this space is by encoding information into a subspace that is spanned by two orthogonal qubits of the 4-dimensional Hilbert space. Suppose information is encoded in the orthogonal state $\alpha|0\rangle + \beta|1\rangle$ in the following way:

$$\alpha|0\rangle_{1} + \beta|1\rangle_{2}\longrightarrow \alpha|0\rangle_{1}\otimes|1\rangle_{2} + \beta|1\rangle_{1}\otimes|0\rangle_{2}.$$

This shows that information has been encoded into a subspace of the two-qubit Hilbert space. Another way of encoding the same information is to encode only one of the qubits of the two qubits. Suppose the first qubit is encoded, then the state of the second qubit is completely arbitrary since:

$$\alpha|0\rangle_{1} + \beta|1\rangle_{2}\longrightarrow \bigl(\alpha|0\rangle_{1} + \beta|1\rangle_{2}\bigr)\otimes|\psi\rangle.$$

This mapping is a one-to-many mapping from the one qubit encoding information to a two-qubit Hilbert space. Instead, if the mapping is to $|\psi\rangle$, then it is identical to a mapping from a qubit to a subspace of the two-qubit Hilbert space.

== See also ==
- Quantum decoherence
- Quantum measurement
