= QRC =

QRC may refer to:

- Qatar Red Crescent Society
- QR code
- Quebec Railway Corporation
- Queen's Royal College
- Quantum reservoir computing
- Quantum random circuits
- QRC, the Q code for "What is your true bearing?"
