= Center for Quantum Information Science & Technology =

US research unit

The Center for Quantum Information Science & Technology (CQIST) is a Multi-School Organized Research Unit at the University of Southern California. Its mission is to advance fundamental experimental and theoretical knowledge in areas of Engineering and Physical Science relevant to Quantum Information Science. CQIST mentors graduate and postdoctoral research, sponsors a visiting scholars program, develops and teaches novel courses, organizes international conferences and workshops, and holds regular seminar series. In December 2007 it hosted the First International Conference on Quantum Error Correction. CQIST was founded in October 2006. Its first and current director is Daniel Lidar.

== Research ==
CQIST faculty members engage in a variety of Quantum Information Science related research, spanning both theoretical and experimental aspects. Currently active research areas include quantum error correction, adiabatic quantum computation, quantum phase transitions, coherent control, photonics, and quantum electronics.
