= Willow processor =

Quantum computing chip

- Developer: Google Quantum AI
- Type: Quantum processor
- Released: December 9, 2024
- Memory: 105 superconducting transmon qubits
- Predecessor: Sycamore

The Willow processor is a 105-qubit superconducting quantum processor developed by Google's Quantum AI division, manufactured in Santa Barbara, California, and announced in 2024.

== Overview ==
Willow is announced on December 9, 2024 via an article published in Nature, succeeding the Sycamore, the company's previous quantum processor. Google claimed improved quantum error correction. The processor completed a random circuit sampling (RCS) benchmark task in 5 minutes, and claimed the task will take 10 septillion (10^{25}) years to complete on the fastest traditional supercomputer at the time.

Willow is constructed with a square grid of superconducting transmon physical qubits. Improvements over past work were attributed to improved fabrication techniques, participation ratio engineering, and circuit parameter optimization.

Willow prompted optimism in accelerating applications in pharmaceuticals, material science, logistics, drug discovery, and energy grid allocation. Popular media responses discussed its risk in breaking cryptographic systems, but a Google spokesman said that they were still at least 10 years out from breaking RSA. Hartmut Neven, founder and lead of Google Quantum AI, told the BBC that Willow would be used in practical applications, and in the announcement blogpost expressed the belief that advanced artificial intelligence will benefit from quantum computing.

Willow follows the release of Foxtail in 2017, Bristlecone in 2018, and Sycamore in 2019. Willow has twice as many qubits as Sycamore and improves upon T1 coherence time from Sycamore's 20 microseconds to 100 microseconds. Willow's 105 qubits have an average connectivity of 3.47.

Hartmut Neven, founder of Google Quantum AI, prompted controversy by claiming that the success of Willow "lends credence to the notion that quantum computation occurs in many parallel universes, in line with the idea that we live in a multiverse, a prediction first made by David Deutsch."

On October 22, 2025, Google announced the first verifiable quantum advantage on hardware, Quantum Echoes. It is approximately 13,000x faster on Willow than the fastest supercomputers in the world.

== Criticism ==
Per Google company's claim, Willow is the first chip to achieve below threshold quantum error correction.

However, a number of critics have pointed out several limitations:

- The logical error rates reported (around 0.14% per cycle) remain orders of magnitude above the 10^{−6} levels believed necessary for running meaningful, large-scale quantum algorithms.
- To date, demonstrations have been limited to quantum memory and the preservation of logical qubits—without yet showing below‑threshold performance of logical gate operations required for universal fault‑tolerant computation.
- Media coverage has been accused of overstating Willow's practical significance; although error suppression scales exponentially with qubit count, no large‑scale quantum algorithms or commercial applications have yet been demonstrated on Willow.
- Observers caution that achieving below‑threshold error correction is only one milestone on the path to practical quantum computing—further hardware improvements (lower physical error rates) and vastly larger qubit arrays will be required before industrially relevant problem‑solving is possible.
- Some experts note that Willow remains a research prototype within the Noisy intermediate-scale quantum era, still far from delivering the practical, fault‑tolerant performance required for real‑world applications.
