= Keith Uncapher =

American computer engineer (1922–2002)

Keith W. Uncapher (1922–2002) was an American computer engineer and manager. At the RAND Corporation Uncapher worked on several pioneering computer projects. He founded the Information Sciences Institute (ISI) at the University of Southern California, Viterbi School of Engineering. There, he assembled teams of engineers who helped to grow the early Internet.

== Biography ==
Keith Uncapher was born in Denver, Colorado April 1, 1922. He attended Glendale Community College and graduated from California Polytechnic State University in San Luis Obispo, California.

== Computer pioneer ==
Uncapher joined RAND Corporation in Santa Monica in 1950.

As director of the computer science division at RAND, Uncapher pioneered work on the technology of packet switching, in which digital messages are broken into small packets, sent over a network and reassembled at their destination. Due to this methods inherent reliability and robustness it attracted a great deal of interest at the Department of Defense Advanced Projects Research Agency. He helped officials see the technology's vast potential for facilitating a revolution in computer communications. Uncapher also designed the first time-sharing computer system for mathematicians. He also led the RAND Tablet Project, a computer system for recognizing hand printed characters using a tablet and stylus. Packet switching research and development led first to the military's ARPANET, and then to the Internet itself.

== Institute founder ==
Uncapher persuaded both the US government and USC Engineering Dean, Zohrab Kaprielian, to form a university-based research agency and ISI opened the offices it still occupies in Marina del Rey, California. With the Vietnam War winding down it was also an ideal time for ISI to help rebuild the gap between the Department of Defense and academia. During the 1980s, along with his colleagues, Uncapher helped to create the MOSIS system that made VLSI design more practical and cost effective for researchers, and as a result, architectural innovation more plentiful.

After co-founding the Corporation for National Research Initiatives in 1986 with Robert E. Kahn, Uncapher worked to advance new areas of information technology. His main focus was on fostering the development of micro-electro-mechanical systems (MEMS) and in particular, MEMS technology and infrastructure.

Uncapher was elected a member of the National Academy of Engineering in 1998 for contributions to information technology at the national level. He also received the "Decoration for Exceptional Civilian Service" from the Department of the United States Air Force as well as the Centennial Medal of the IEEE Computer Society . His service included participating on the United States Air Force Scientific Advisory Board, Defense Information Systems Agency's Scientific Advisory Group, and the Institute for Defense Analyses Computer Science Advisory Group.

He was an active participant in the National Research Council, Board of Telecommunications. He was a member of the Federal Judicial Center's Scientific Advisory Group, and served on the EDUCOM Board of Trustees.

He chaired Stanford University's Computer Science Advisory Committee, and Carnegie Mellon's Computer Science Advisory Board. He was also a Director of Foretec Seminars.

Uncapher died while living in Los Angeles, California on October 10, 2002 of heart failure.
