= D-Wave Two =

- Also known as: Vesuvius
- Developer: D-Wave Systems
- Manufacturer: D-Wave Systems
- Product family: D-Wave
- Type: Quantum computer
- CPU: Approximately 512-qubit (varies)
- Dimensions: 10 square metre room
- Predecessor: D-Wave One
- Successor: D-Wave 2X
- Website: www.dwavesys.com/d-wave-two-system

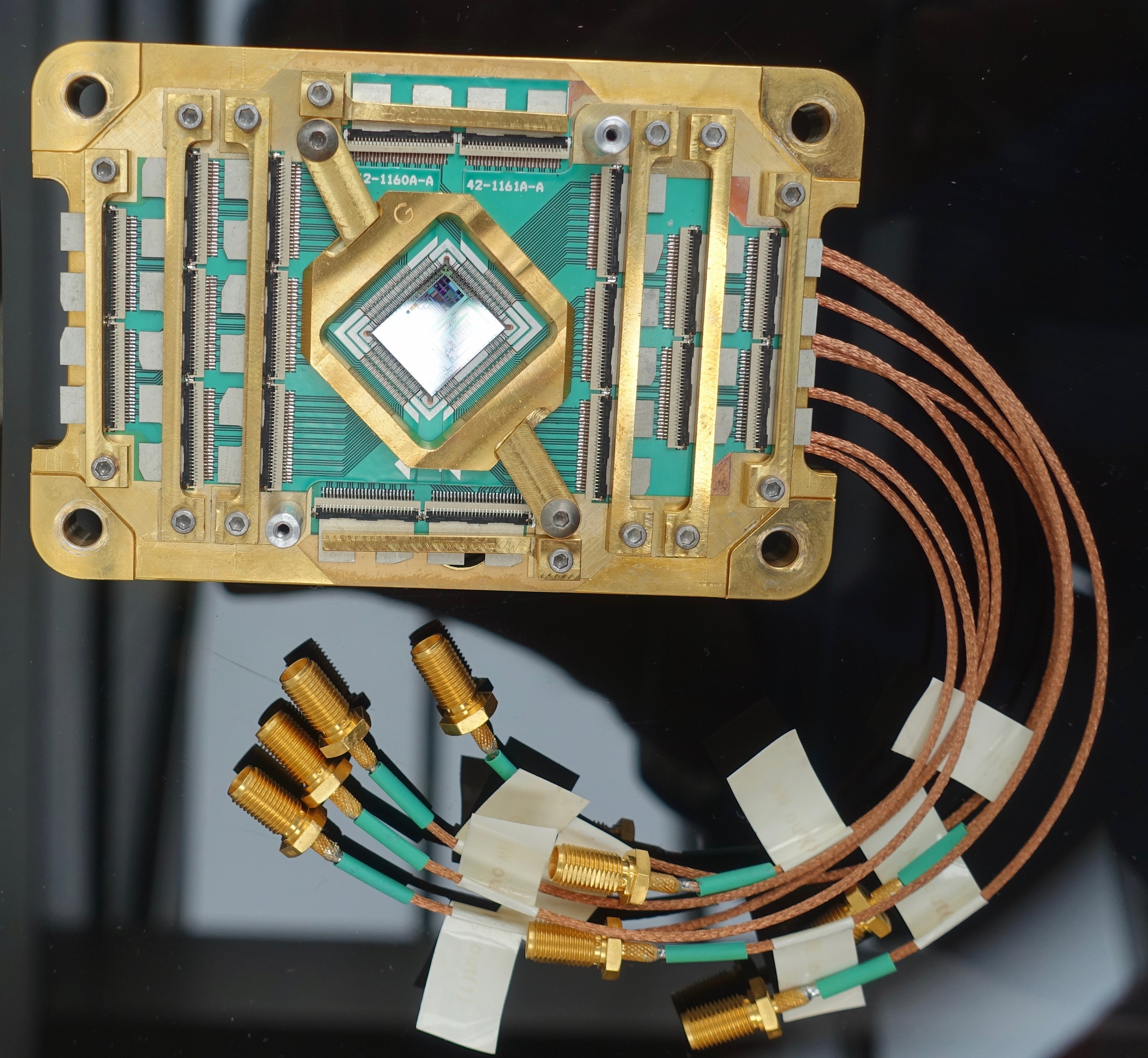
The D-Wave Two 512 qubit Vesuvius chip in the package, ready for cooling to near-absolute zero. At D-Wave's Canadian headquarters for their Board meeting.

D-Wave Two (project code name Vesuvius) is the second commercially available quantum computer, and the successor to the first commercially available quantum computer, D-Wave One. Both computers were developed by Canadian company D-Wave Systems. The computers are not general purpose, but rather are designed for quantum annealing. Specifically, the computers are designed to use quantum annealing to solve a single type of problem known as quadratic unconstrained binary optimization. As of 2015, it was still debated whether large-scale entanglement takes place in D-Wave Two, and whether current or future generations of D-Wave computers will have any advantage over classical computers.

== Processor ==
D-Wave Two has a QPU (quantum processing unit) of 512 qubits—an improvement over the D-Wave One series' QPUs of about 128 qubits The number of qubits can vary from chip to chip, due to variations in manufacturing. The increase in qubit count for the D-Wave Two was accomplished by tiling qubit pattern of the D-Wave One. This pattern, named chimera by D-Wave Systems, has a limited connectivity such that a given qubit can only interact with at most six other qubits. As with the D-Wave One, this restricted connectivity greatly limits the optimization problems that can be approached with the hardware.

== Quantum computing ==
In March 2013, several groups of researchers at the Adiabatic Quantum Computing workshop at the Institute of Physics in London produced evidence of quantum entanglement in D-Wave CPUs. In March 2014, researchers from University College London and the University of Southern California corroborated their findings; in their tests, the D-Wave Two exhibited the quantum physics outcome that it should while not showing three different classical physics outcomes.

In May 2013, Catherine McGeoch verified that D-Wave Two finds solutions to a synthetic benchmark set of Ising spin optimization problems. Boixo et al. (2014) evidenced that the D-Wave Two performs quantum annealing, but that a simulated annealing on a notebook computer also performs well. Jean Francois Puget of IBM compared computation on the D-Wave Two with IBM's CPLEX software.

A D-Wave Two in the Quantum Artificial Intelligence Lab at the NASA Advanced Supercomputing Division of Ames Research Center is used. NASA, Google, and the Universities Space Research Association (USRA) started the lab in 2013.

In July 2016, computer music researcher Alexis Kirke used a harmony algorithm developed for the D-Wave Two live in a public musical performance for mezzo-soprano and electronics in the UK.

In January 2021, a multi-institutional group of researches from Oak Ridge National Laboratory, Purdue University and D-Wave generated accurate results from materials science simulations on the DWave-2000Q processor that can be verified with neutron scattering experiments and other practical techniques.
