= USC Information Sciences Institute =

Research institute of the University of Southern California

Coordinates: 33.9802°N 118.440031°W

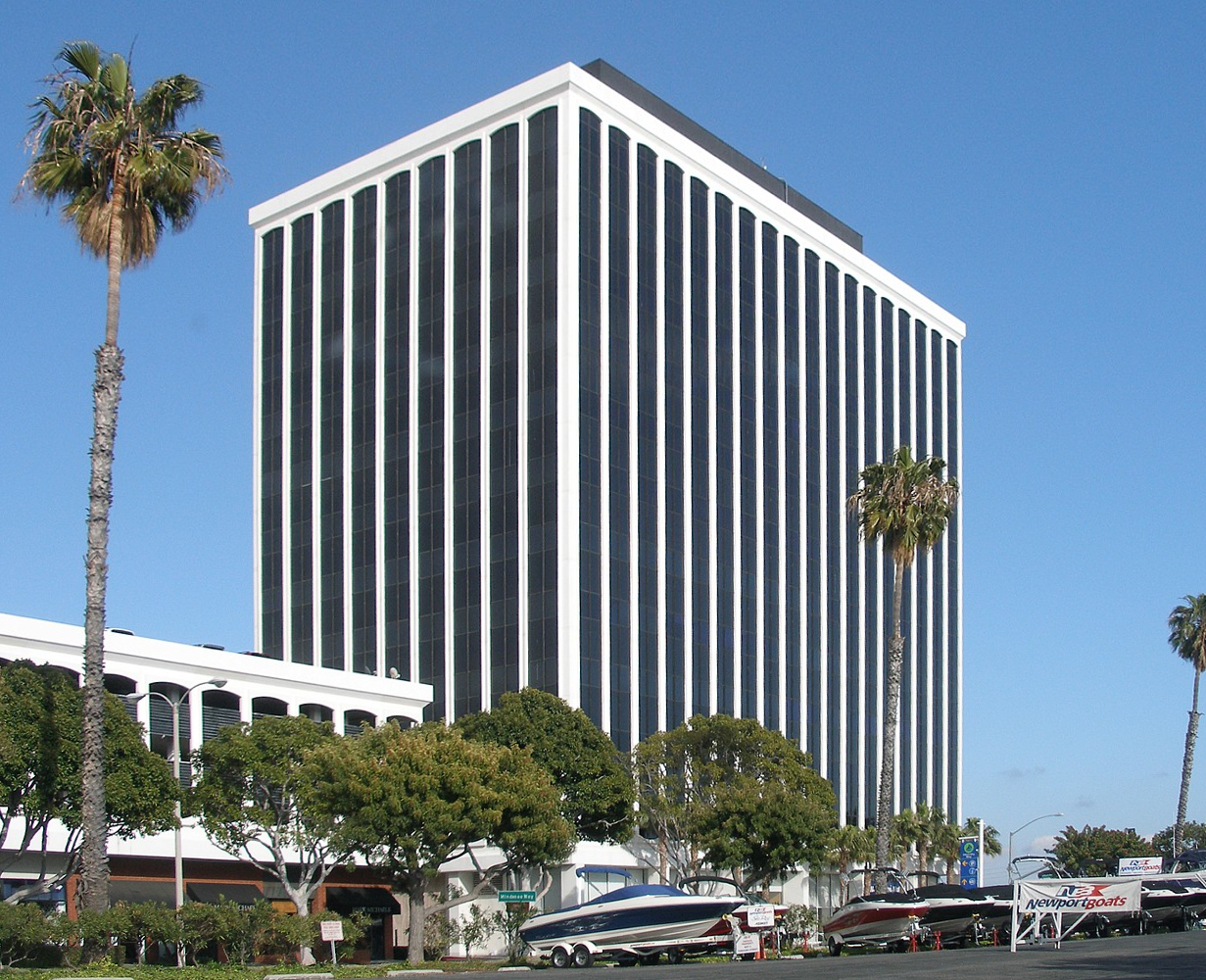
ISI headquarters in Marina del Rey, CA

The USC Information Sciences Institute (ISI) is a research institute affiliated with the Viterbi School of Engineering at the University of Southern California (USC). It is located in Marina del Rey, California, United States. It specializes in research and development in information processing, computing, and communications technologies.

ISI actively participated in the information revolution, and it played a leading role in developing and managing the early Internet and its predecessor ARPAnet.

== Research and sponsors ==
ISI research spans artificial intelligence (AI), cybersecurity, grid computing, cloud computing, quantum computing, microelectronics, supercomputing, nano-satellites and many other areas. AI expertise includes natural language processing, in which ISI has an international reputation, reconfigurable robotics, information integration, motion analysis and social media analysis. Hardware/software expertise includes cyber-physical system security, data mining, reconfigurable computing and cloud computing. In networking, ISI explores Internet resilience, Internet traffic analysis and photonics, among other areas. Researchers also work in scientific data management, Wireless technologies, biomimetics and electrical smart grid, in which ISI is advising the Los Angeles Department of Water and Power on a major demonstration project. Another current initiative involves big data brain imaging jointly with the USC Keck School of Medicine.

== History ==
ISI was founded by Keith Uncapher, who headed the computer research group at RAND Corporation in the 1960s and early 1970s. Uncapher decided to leave RAND after his group's funding was cut in 1971. He approached the University of California, Los Angeles about creating an off-campus technology institute, but was told that a decision would take 15 months. He then presented the concept to USC, which approved the proposal in five days. ISI was launched with three employees in 1972. Its first proposal was funded by the Defense Advanced Research Projects Agency (DARPA) in 30 days for $6 million.

ISI became one of the earliest nodes on ARPANET, the predecessor to the Internet, and in 1977 figured prominently in a demonstration of its international viability. ISI also helped refine the TCP/IP communications protocols fundamental to Net operations, and researcher Paul Mockapetris developed the now-familiar Domain Name System characterized by .com, .org, .net, .gov, and .edu on which the Net still operates. (The names .com, .org et al. were invented at SRI International, an ongoing collaborator.) Steve Crocker originated the Request for Comments (RFC) series, the written record of the network's technical structure and operation that both documented and shaped the emerging Internet. Another ISI researcher, Danny Cohen, became first to implement packet voice and packet video over ARPANET, demonstrating the viability of packet switching for real-time applications.

Jonathan Postel collaborated in development of TCP/IP, DNS and the SMTP protocol that supports email. He also edited the RFC for nearly three decades until his sudden death in 1998, when ISI colleagues assumed responsibility. The Institute retained that role until 2009. Postel simultaneously directed the Internet Assigned Numbers Authority (IANA) and its predecessor, which assign Internet addresses. IANA was administered from ISI until a nonprofit organization, ICANN, was created for that purpose in 1998.

== Other achievements ==
Some of the first Net security applications, and one of the world's first portable computers, also originated at ISI.

ISI researchers also created or co-created the:

- GLOBUS grid computing standard
- LOOM knowledge representation language and environment, or LOOM (ontology)
- MONARCH supercomputer-on-a-chip
- Soar (cognitive architecture) for developing intelligent behavioral systems
- Pegasus (workflow management)

In 2011, several ISI natural language experts advised the IBM team that created Watson, the computer that became the first machine to win against human competitors on the Jeopardy! TV show. In 2012, ISI's Kevin Knight spearheaded a successful drive to crack the Copiale cipher, a lengthy encrypted manuscript that had remained unreadable for 250 years. Also in 2012, the USC-Lockheed Martin Quantum Computing Center (QCC) became the first organization to operate a quantum annealing system outside of its manufacturer, D-Wave Systems, Inc. USC, ISI and Lockheed Martin now are performing basic and applied research into quantum computing. A second quantum annealing system is located at NASA Ames Research Center, and is operated jointly by NASA and Google.

The USC Andrew and Erna Viterbi School of Engineering was ranked among the nation's top 10 engineering graduate schools by US News & World Report in 2015. Including ISI, USC is ranked first nationally in federal computer science research and development expenditures.

== Organizational structure ==
ISI is organized into seven divisions focused on differing areas of research expertise:

- Advanced Electronics: MOSIS shared-services integrated circuit research and fabrication, CMOS and post-CMOS concepts, and biomimetics
- Computational Systems and Technology: quantum computing; supercomputing; cloud, wireless, reconfigurable and multicore computing; microarchitecture and electronics; science automation technologies; social networks and space systems
- Informatics Systems Research: grid computing, information security, service-oriented architectures, imaging and medical informatics that aim to transform healthcare discovery processes, practice and delivery.
- Artificial Intelligence: artificial intelligence in natural language, machine translation, information integration, education, robotics and other disciplines.
- Networking and Cybersecurity: internet security research and international testbed, internet measurement and monitoring approaches, and sensor networks that emphasize both networking theory and practice.
- Space Technology and Systems: space research and hands-on involvement for students through the Space Engineering Research Center, operated jointly by ISI and USC.
- Vision, Image, Speech and Text Analytics: ISI's Center for Vision, Image, Speech and Text Analytics (VISTA) is an internationally recognized leader in areas such as multimedia signal processing, computer vision, and natural language analysis.

Smaller, specialized research groups operate within almost all divisions.

ISI is led by Executive Director Craig Knoblock, the previous director to the AI division.
