= Google Quantum AI =

Research division of Google

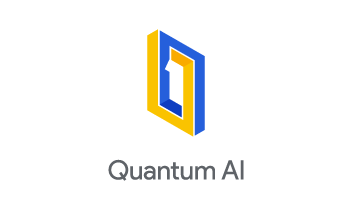
- Type: Research division
- Industry: Quantum computing Quantum information science
- Incorporated: United States
- Founded: 2012
- Founder: Hartmut Neven
- Headquarters: Goleta, California, United States
- Area served: Worldwide
- Products: Willow; Sycamore quantum processor; Foxtail & Bristol Cone
- Services: Quantum computing and AI research
- Parent: Google LLC
- Divisions: Quantum hardware Quantum algorithms Quantum error correction
- Website: quantumai.google

Google Quantum AI is a research division of Google focused on developing quantum computing technologies. The division was launched by Google scientist Hartmun Neven in 2012. The long-term goal of the effort is to build large-scale, error-corrected quantum computers and advance quantum hardware, software, and algorithms for scientific and practical applications beyond the capacities of classical computers.

== History ==
The initial concept for Google Quantum AI was hatched in 2006 by Google scientist Hartmut Neven in an attempt to accelerate advances in machine learning. The division's current Santa Barbara area campus was selected in 2013 due in large part to proximity to the University of California at Santa Barbara and the local quantum-science ecosystem which had grown up in the area. In 2014 Google recruited prominent UCSB professor John Martinis and his research team to join in building Google's proprietary quantum computer. As part of his work with Google, Martinis would share the 2025 Nobel prize in Physics.

In 2019, Google claimed "quantum supremacy". Using their 53-qubit Sycamore processor, it claimed to be able to perform in about 200 seconds a task that they estimated would take the world's most powerful classical supercomputer 10,000 years to solve.

In 2023, Google published a paper with the first demonstration of a logical qubit prototype, showing the possibility of suppressing computational errors by scaling up the number of qubits in a scheme known as quantum error correction.

The latest quantum computing chip was announced in 2025, named Willow. Willow achieved exponential error reduction. In a maximum complexity benchmark (Random Circuit Sampling), Willow completed a computational task in under five minutes that would take the fastest modern supercomputers 10 septillion ($10^{25}$) years.
