= Catherine McGeoch =

American computer scientist

Catherine Cole McGeoch is an American computer scientist specializing in empirical algorithmics and heuristics for NP-hard problems. She is currently Beitzel Professor in Technology and Society at Amherst College. She has been the Editor in Chief of ACM Journal of Experimental Algorithmics and was a member of the ACM Publications Board.

== Biography ==
McGeoch graduated summa cum laude from Butler University in 1981. She then earned her M.S. (1983) and her Ph.D.(1986) from Carnegie Mellon University, supervised by Jon Bentley. She is the author of A Guide to Experimental Algorithmics (ISBN 9781107001732) and Adiabatic Quantum Computation and Quantum Annealing: Theory and Practice (ISBN 9781627053358).

In 2013, she published one of the first detailed benchmarks of D-Wave's Quantum Computer versus conventional software. Her work was featured in an Amherst College press release and was subsequently cited in numerous media outlets, including The New York Times, The Economist and The New Yorker. Starting in May 2014 she took a leave of absence from Amherst College to work full-time for D-Wave.
