= Lorenza Viola =

Italian theoretical physicist

Lorenza Viola is an Italian-US theoretical physicist who works in quantum information science at Dartmouth College in Hanover, New Hampshire, United States as the James Frank Family Professor of Physics.

== Education and career ==
Viola earned a master's degree (laurea summa cum laude) in physics from the University of Trento in 1991. She completed her Ph.D. in 1996 at the University of Padua with a dissertation Relativistic stochastic quantization through co-moving coordinates supervised by Laura M. Morato.

After postdoctoral research at the Massachusetts Institute of Technology and the Los Alamos National Laboratory, and then working for three more years at Los Alamos as a J. Robert Oppenheimer Fellow, she joined Dartmouth as an associate professor in 2004. She was promoted to full professor in 2012.

== Recognition ==
In 2014, Viola was named a Fellow of the American Physical Society (APS), after a nomination from the APS Division of Quantum Information, "for seminal contributions at the interface between quantum information theory and quantum statistical mechanics, in particular, methods for decoherence control based on dynamical decoupling and noiseless subsystems and for characterizing entanglement in quantum many-body systems".
