= D-Wave Systems =

Quantum computing company

Coordinates: 49.256613°N 122.9990452°W

D-Wave Quantum Inc.
- Type: Public
- Traded as: NYSE: QBTS
- Industry: Computer hardware
- Founded: 1999; 27 years ago
- Founders: Haig Farris; Geordie Rose; Bob Wiens; Alexandre Zagoskin; Juan Nohandz
- Headquarters: Palo Alto, California, United States
- Key people: Alan Baratz, CEO; Eric Ladizinsky, Chief Scientist; Sharon Holt, Chair of the Board; Dr Robert J. Schoelkopf, Chief Science Officer
- Products: D-Wave One, D-Wave Two, D-Wave 2X, D-Wave 2000Q, D-Wave Advantage, Advantage2
- Revenue: ▲US$24.6 million (2025)
- Net income: ▼ −US$355 million (2025)
- Number of employees: 388 (2025)
- Subsidiaries: D-Wave Government
- Website: dwavequantum.com

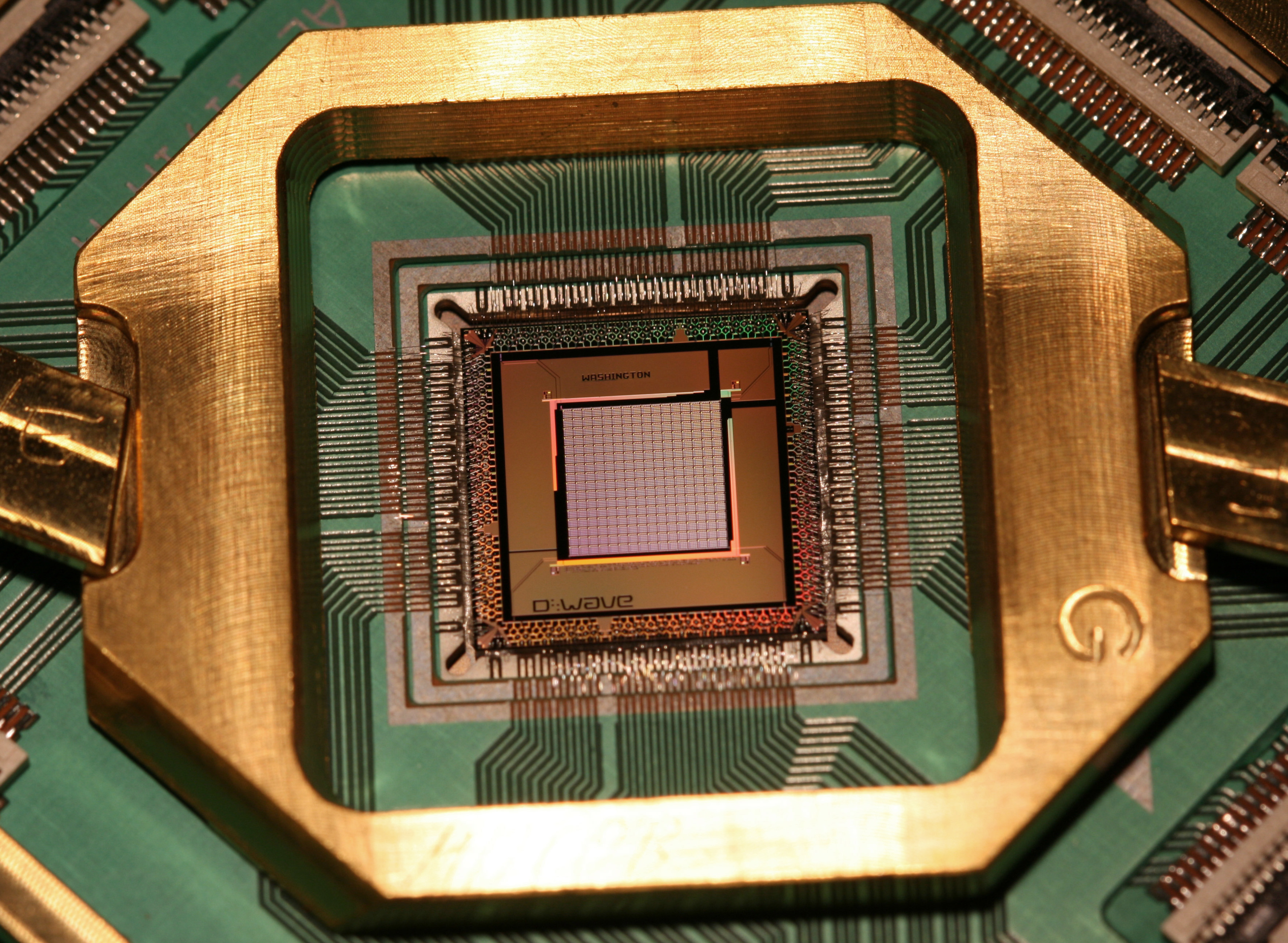
Photograph of the D-Wave 2X 1000 Qubit quantum annealing processor chip mounted and wire-bonded in its sample holder. This chip was introduced in 2015 and has 128,472 Josephson junctions.

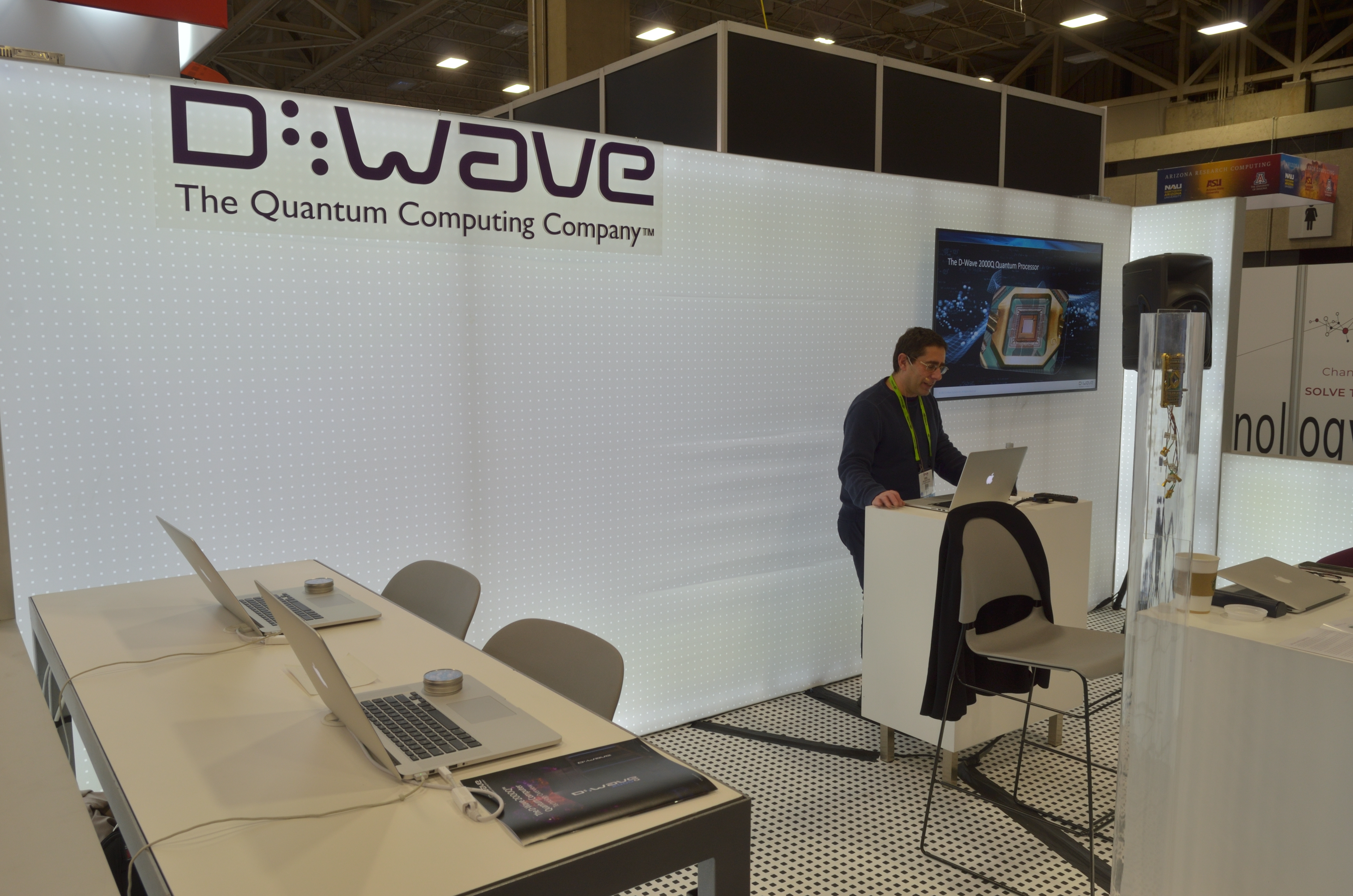
D-Wave at the SC18 conference

D-Wave Quantum Inc. is a quantum computing company with locations in Palo Alto, California and Burnaby, British Columbia. D-Wave claims to be the world's first company to sell computers that exploit quantum effects in their operation. D-Wave's early customers include Lockheed Martin, the University of Southern California, Google/NASA, and Los Alamos National Laboratory.

D-Wave does not implement a generic, universal quantum computer; instead, their computers implement specialized quantum annealing.

== History ==
D-Wave was founded by Haig Farris, Geordie Rose, Bob Wiens, and Alexandre Zagoskin in 1999. Farris taught a business course at the University of British Columbia (UBC), where Rose obtained his PhD, and Zagoskin was a postdoctoral fellow. The company name refers to their first qubit designs, which used d-wave superconductors. D-Wave operated from various locations in Vancouver, British Columbia, and laboratory spaces at UBC before moving to its current location in the neighboring suburb of Burnaby. D-Wave was headquarted in Palo Alto, California. In January 2026, D-Wave announced that they would move their headquarters to Boca Raton, Florida by the end of 2026.

D-Wave operated as an offshoot from UBC, while maintaining ties with the Department of Physics and Astronomy. It funded academic research in quantum computing, thus building a collaborative network of research scientists. The company collaborated with several universities and institutions, including UBC, IPHT Jena, Université de Sherbrooke, University of Toronto, University of Twente, Chalmers University of Technology, University of Erlangen, and Jet Propulsion Laboratory. These partnerships were listed on D-Wave's website until 2005. In June 2014, D-Wave announced a new quantum applications ecosystem with computational finance firm 1QB Information Technologies (1QBit) and cancer research group DNA-SEQ to focus on solving real-world problems with quantum hardware.

On May 11, 2011, D-Wave announced D-Wave One, described as "the world's first commercially available quantum computer", operating on a 128-qubit chipset using quantum annealing (a general method for finding the global minimum of a function by a process using quantum fluctuations) to solve optimization problems. The D-Wave One was built on early prototypes such as D-Wave's Orion Quantum Computer. The prototype was a 16-qubit quantum annealing processor, demonstrated on February 13, 2007, at the Computer History Museum in Mountain View, California. D-Wave demonstrated what they claimed to be a 28-qubit quantum annealing processor on November 12, 2007. The chip was fabricated at the NASA Jet Propulsion Laboratory Microdevices Lab in Pasadena, California.

In May 2013, a collaboration between NASA, Google, and the Universities Space Research Association (USRA) launched a Quantum Artificial Intelligence Lab based on the D-Wave Two 512-qubit quantum computer that would be used for research into machine learning, among other fields of study.

On February 17, 2014, D-Wave was featured on the cover of Time magazine. In the accompanying article, Lev Grossman describes D-Wave's approach to quantum computing, the potential of the technology, and the enthusiasm of investors like Jeff Bezos, while acknowledging skepticism from some critics.

On August 20, 2015, D-Wave announced the general availability of the D-Wave 2X system, a 1000-qubit+ quantum computer. This was followed by an announcement on September 28, 2015, that it had been installed at the Quantum Artificial Intelligence Lab at NASA Ames Research Center.

In January 2017, D-Wave released the D-Wave 2000Q, and an open-source repository containing software tools for quantum annealers. It contains Qbsolv, which is open-source software that solves quadratic unconstrained binary optimization problems on both the company's quantum processors and classic hardware architectures.

In 2018, D-Wave released the Leap quantum cloud service.

In 2025, D-Wave announced the sale of an Advantage system to Forschungszentrum Jülich, a research center in Germany. The system is installed at Jülich Supercomputing Centre (JSC) at Forschungszentrum Jülich. Scientists at JSC, working with collaborators from other institutions, published in Nature the results of research conducted on the Advantage system simulating the dynamics of false vacuum decay. This work demonstrates that quantum computers can be used to explore complex cosmological phenomena.

Also in 2025, D-Wave published a paper in the journal Science describing a computational simulation of a magnetic material that was performed on a quantum computer dramatically faster than performing such a simulation on a traditional computer. However, some physicists questioned these claims.

In January 2026, D-Wave acquired Quantum Circuits Inc. Following which, Robert J. Schoelkopf co-founder of Quantum Circuits, was appointed D-Wave's Chief Science Officer.

On July 27, 2026, CEO Alan Baratz rang the Nasdaq Opening Bell, marking the company’s listing debut on the exchange.

== Computer systems ==
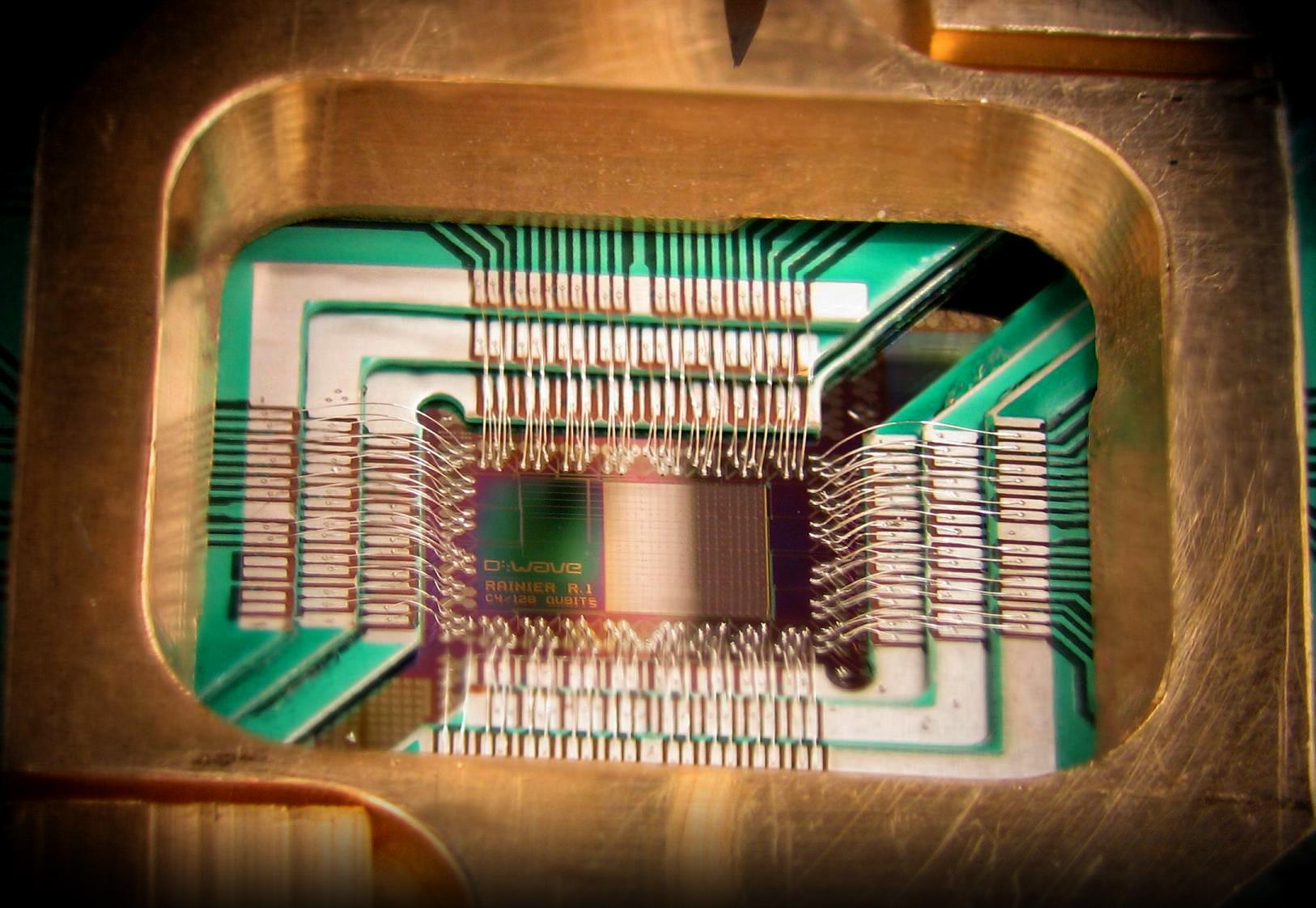
Photograph of a chip constructed by D-Wave Systems Inc., designed to operate as a 128-qubit superconducting adiabatic quantum optimization processor, mounted in a sample holder

The first commercially produced D-Wave processor was a programmable, superconducting integrated circuit with up to 128 pair-wise coupled superconducting flux qubits. The 128-qubit processor was superseded by a 512-qubit processor in 2013. The processor is designed to implement a special-purpose quantum annealing as opposed to being operated as a universal gate-model quantum computer.

The underlying ideas for the D-Wave approach arose from experimental results in condensed matter physics, and particular work on quantum annealing in magnets performed by Gabriel Aeppli, Thomas Felix Rosenbaum, and collaborators, who had been checking the advantages, proposed by Bikas K. Chakrabarti & collaborators, of quantum tunneling/fluctuations in the search for ground state(s) in spin glasses. These ideas were later recast in the language of quantum computation by MIT physicists Edward Farhi, Seth Lloyd, Terry Orlando, and Bill Kaminsky, whose publications in 2000 and 2004 provided both a theoretical model for quantum computation that fit with the earlier work in quantum magnetism (specifically the adiabatic quantum computing model and quantum annealing, its finite temperature variant), and a specific enablement of that idea using superconducting flux qubits which is a close cousin to the designs D-Wave produced.

=== Orion prototype ===
On February 13, 2007, D-Wave demonstrated the Orion system, running three different applications at the Computer History Museum in Mountain View, California. This marked the first public demonstration of, supposedly, a quantum computer and associated service.

The first application, an example of pattern matching, performed a search for a similar compound to a known drug within a database of molecules. The next application computed a seating arrangement for an event subject to compatibilities and incompatibilities between guests. The last involved solving a Sudoku puzzle.

The processors at the heart of D-Wave's "Orion quantum computing system" are designed for use as hardware accelerator processors rather than general-purpose computer microprocessors. The system is designed to solve a particular NP-complete problem related to the two-dimensional Ising model in a magnetic field. D-Wave terms the device as a 16-qubit superconducting adiabatic quantum computer processor.

According to the company, a conventional front-end running an application that requires the solution of an NP-complete problem, such as pattern matching, passes the problem to the Orion system.

According to Geordie Rose, founder and Chief Technology Officer of D-Wave, NP-complete problems "are probably not exactly solvable, no matter how big, fast or advanced computers get"; the adiabatic quantum computer used by the Orion system is intended to quickly compute an approximate solution.

==== 2009 Google demonstration ====
On December 8, 2009, at the Neural Information Processing Systems (NeurIPS) conference, a Google research team led by Hartmut Neven used D-Wave's processor to train a binary image classifier.

=== D-Wave One ===
On May 11, 2011, D-Wave announced the D-Wave One, an integrated quantum computer system running on a 128-qubit processor. The processor used in the D-Wave One, performs a single mathematical operation, discrete optimization. Rainier uses quantum annealing to solve optimization problems. The D-Wave One was claimed to be the world's first commercially available quantum computer system. Its price was quoted at approximately US$10,000,000.

A research team led by Matthias Troyer and Daniel Lidar found that, while there is evidence of quantum annealing in D-Wave One, they saw no speed increase compared to classical computers. They implemented an optimized classical algorithm to solve the same particular problem as the D-Wave One.

==== Lockheed Martin and D-Wave collaboration ====
In November 2010, Lockheed Martin signed a multi-year contract with D-Wave to realize the benefits based upon a quantum annealing processor applied to some of Lockheed's most challenging computation problems. The contract was later announced on May 25, 2011. The contract included the purchase of the D-Wave One quantum computer, maintenance, and associated professional services.

==== Optimization problem-solving in protein structure determination ====
In August 2012, a team of Harvard University researchers presented results of the largest protein-folding problem solved to date using a quantum computer. The researchers solved instances of a lattice protein folding model, known as the Miyazawa–Jernigan model, on a D-Wave One quantum computer.

=== D-Wave Two ===
In early 2012, D-Wave revealed a 512-qubit quantum computer, which was launched as a production processor in 2013.

In May 2013, Catherine McGeoch, a consultant for D-Wave, published the first comparison of the technology against regular top-end desktop computers running an optimization algorithm. Using a configuration with 439 qubits, the system performed 3,600 times as fast as CPLEX, the best algorithm on the conventional machine, solving problems with 100 or more variables in half a second compared with half an hour. The results are presented at the Computing Frontiers 2013 conference.

In March 2013, several groups of researchers at the Adiabatic Quantum Computing workshop at the Institute of Physics in London, England, produced evidence, though only indirect, of quantum entanglement in the D-Wave chips.

In May 2013, it was announced that a collaboration between NASA, Google, and the USRA launched a Quantum Artificial Intelligence Lab at the NASA Advanced Supercomputing Division at Ames Research Center in California, using a 512-qubit D-Wave Two that would be used for research into machine learning, among other fields of study.

=== D-Wave 2X and D-Wave 2000Q ===
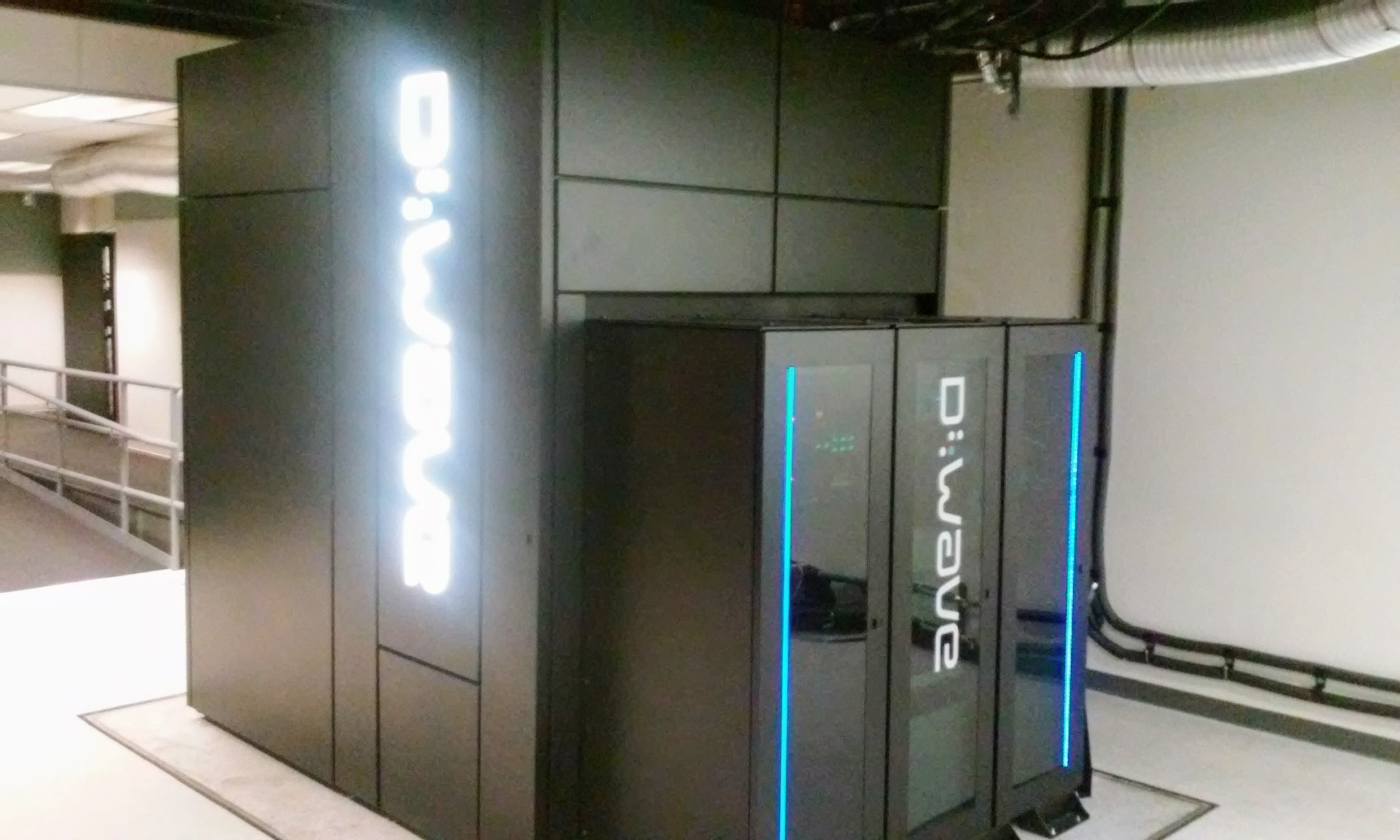
D-wave Computer in February 2017

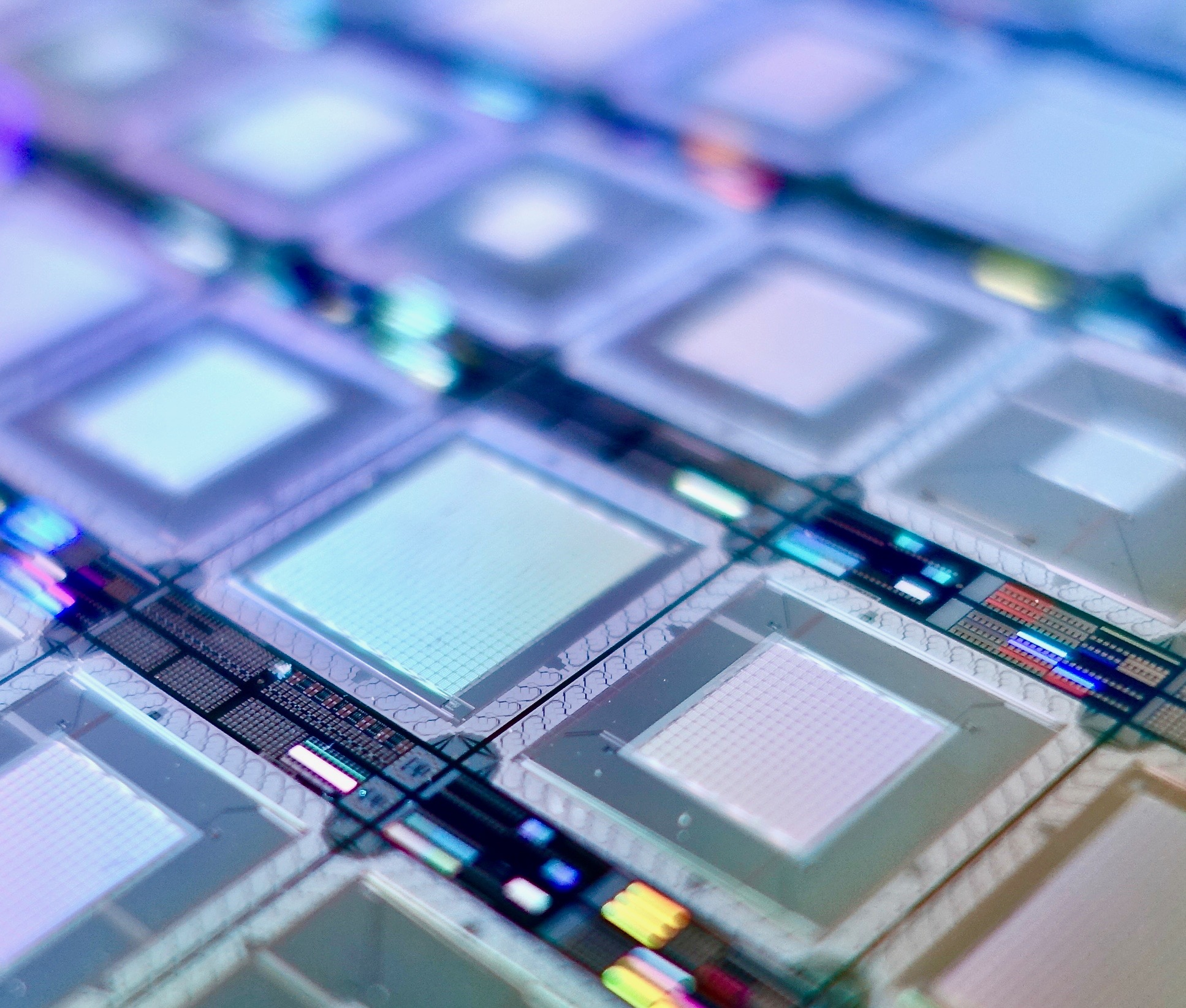
D-Wave 2000 qubit processor wafer, 2018

On August 20, 2015, D-Wave released the general availability of their D-Wave 2X computer, with 1000 qubits in a Chimera graph architecture (although, due to magnetic offsets and manufacturing variability inherent in the superconductor circuit fabrication, fewer than 1152 qubits are functional and available for use; the exact number of qubits yielded will vary with each specific processor manufactured). This was accompanied by a report comparing speeds with high-end single-threaded CPUs. Unlike previous reports, this one explicitly stated that the question of quantum speedup was not something they were trying to address, and focused on constant-factor performance gains over classical hardware. For general-purpose problems, a speedup of 15x was reported, but it is worth noting that these classical algorithms benefit efficiently from parallelization—so that the computer would be performing on par with, perhaps, 30 traditional high-end single-threaded cores.

The D-Wave 2X processor is based on a 2048-qubit chip with half of the qubits disabled; these were activated in the D-Wave 2000Q.

== Incidents and criticisms ==
Despite its pioneering role in quantum annealing, D-Wave has faced criticism regarding the practical utility and commercial viability of its systems. In March 2025, D-Wave announced that it had achieved what it described as "quantum supremacy," reporting that its latest quantum annealer solved a specialized optimization problem faster than the world's most powerful classical supercomputers could replicate the result. The Wall Street Journal noted that while the experiment demonstrated a performance gap favoring D-Wave's hardware, skeptics argued the problem was carefully chosen to highlight the system's strengths and did not reflect general-purpose computational tasks. Critics further observed that advances in classical algorithms might soon close this benchmark gap, suggesting that D-Wave's claimed supremacy may be limited to narrow, contrived applications rather than broad, real-world problems. In April 2025, independent investment research firm Kerrisdale Capital argued that D-Wave's market valuation was "disconnected from its stagnating revenue and lack of broad commercial adoption," highlighting concerns over significant share dilution and questioning the company's path to profitability.

== See also ==
- List of quantum processors
- List of companies involved in quantum computing or communication
- Adiabatic quantum computation
- Analog computer
- AQUA@home
- Flux qubit
- Quantum annealing
- Superconducting quantum computing
- IBM Q System One
