= Josephson junction count =

Number of Josephson junctions on a superconducting integrated circuit chip

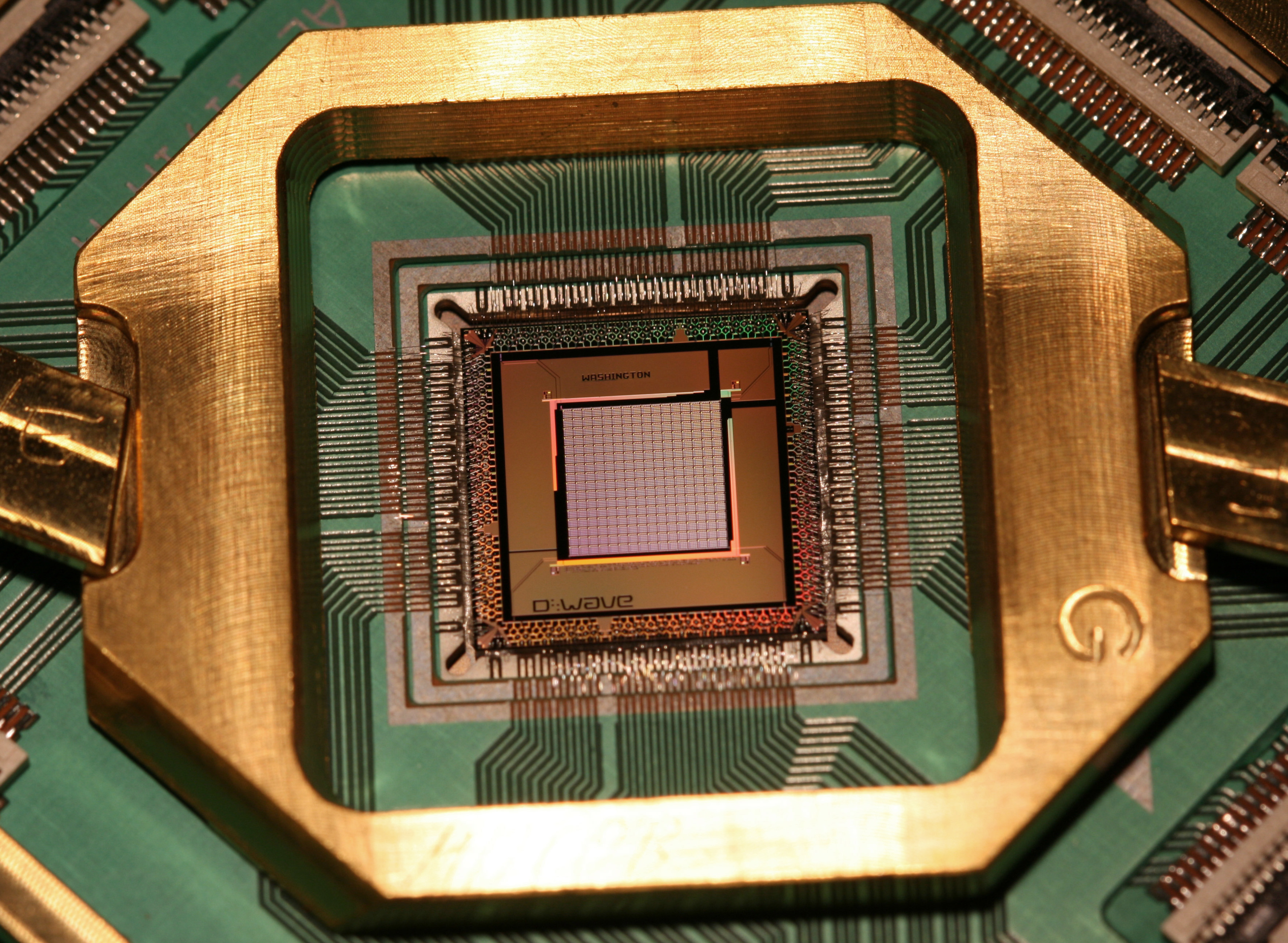
Photograph of the D-Wave TwoX "Washington" quantum annealing processor chip mounted and wire-bonded in a sample holder. This chip was introduced in 2015 and includes 128,472 Josephson junctions.

The Josephson junction count is the number of Josephson junctions on a superconducting integrated circuit chip. Josephson junctions are active circuit elements in superconducting circuits. The Josephson junction count is a measure of circuit or device complexity, similar to the transistor count used for semiconductor integrated circuits.

Examples of circuits using Josephson junctions include digital circuits based on SFQ logic (e.g., RSFQ, RQL, adiabatic quantum flux parametron), superconducting quantum computing circuits, superconducting analog circuits, etc.

== Integrated circuits ==
The superconducting integrated circuits listed here must have been fabricated and tested, but are not required to be commercially available. Chip area includes the full extent of the chip.

Reference	Description	Junction count	Date	Maker	Process	Circuit [mm²]	Chip [mm²]
	RSFQ NOT gate	13	1987	Moscow State U.	10 μm, 5 MA/m^{2}, 2 Nb	1.1	?
CORE1α6	RSFQ microprocessor, 8 bit	6,319	2004	NEC	2 μm, 25 MA/m^{2}	10.9	?
SCRAM2	RSFQ microprocessor, 8 bit	8,197	2006	SRL	2 μm, 25 MA/m^{2}	15.3	25
CORE1γ	RSFQ microprocessor, 8 bit	22,302	2007	ISTEC	2 μm, 25 MA/m^{2}	40.45	64
Rainier	RSFQ, 128 qubit QA processor	23,360	2010	D-Wave, SVTC	250 nm, 2.5 MA/m^{2}, 6 Nb	8	32
Vesuvius	SFQ, 512 qubit QA processor	96,000	2012	D-Wave, SVTC	250 nm, 2.5 MA/m^{2}, 6 Nb	8	162
	RSFQ, 16-bit adder	12,785	2012	SBU, AIST	1 μm, 100 MA/m^{2}, 10 Nb	8.5	29.75
	8,192 bit shift register	32,800	2014	SBU, MIT-LL	500 nm, 100 MA/m^{2}, 8 Nb	9	25
Washington (W1K)	SFQ, 2048 qubit QA processor	128,472	2015	D-Wave, Cypress	250 nm, 2.5 MA/m^{2}, 6 Nb	30.3	136
	RQL, 2 shift registers	72,800	2015	NGC, MIT-LL	500 nm, 100 MA/m^{2}, 8 Nb	9	25
	16000 bit shift register	65,000	2017	SBU, MIT-LL	500 nm, 100 MA/m^{2}, 8 Nb	12	25
	36000 bit shift register	144,000	2017	SBU, MIT-LL	350 nm, 100 MA/m^{2}, 8 Nb	15	25
	202280 bit shift register	809,150	2017	SBU, MIT-LL	350 nm, 100 MA/m^{2}, 8 Nb	64	100
Pegasus P16	SFQ, 5640 qubit QA processor	1,030,000	2020	D-Wave, SkyWater Technology	250 nm, 2.5 MA/m^{2}, 6 Nb	70.6	?

Maker column may include organizations that designed and fabricated the chip.

Process column information: minimum linewidth, Josephson junction critical current density, superconducting layer number and materials. Conversions for units of critical current density: 1 MA/m^{2} = 1 μA/μm^{2} = 100 A/cm^{2}.

== Memory ==
Memory is an electronic data storage device, often used as computer memory, on a single integrated circuit chip. The superconducting integrated circuits listed here must have been fabricated and tested, but are not required to be commercially available. Chip area includes the full extent of the chip.

Reference	Description	Junction count	Date	Maker	Process	Circuit [mm²]	Chip [mm²]
	1024 bit ROM, NbN/MgO/NbN junctions	5,943	1990	Electrotechnical Lab, Japan	3 μm, 5.6 MA/m^{2}, 2 Nb + 1 Pb-In	?	17.25
	4096 bit RAM	23,488	2005	ISTEC	1 μm, 100 MA/m^{2}, 10 Nb	5.5	?
