= Microelectronics and Computer Technology Corporation =

Former US computer research consortium

Coordinates: 30°23′43.22″N 97°44′6.76″W

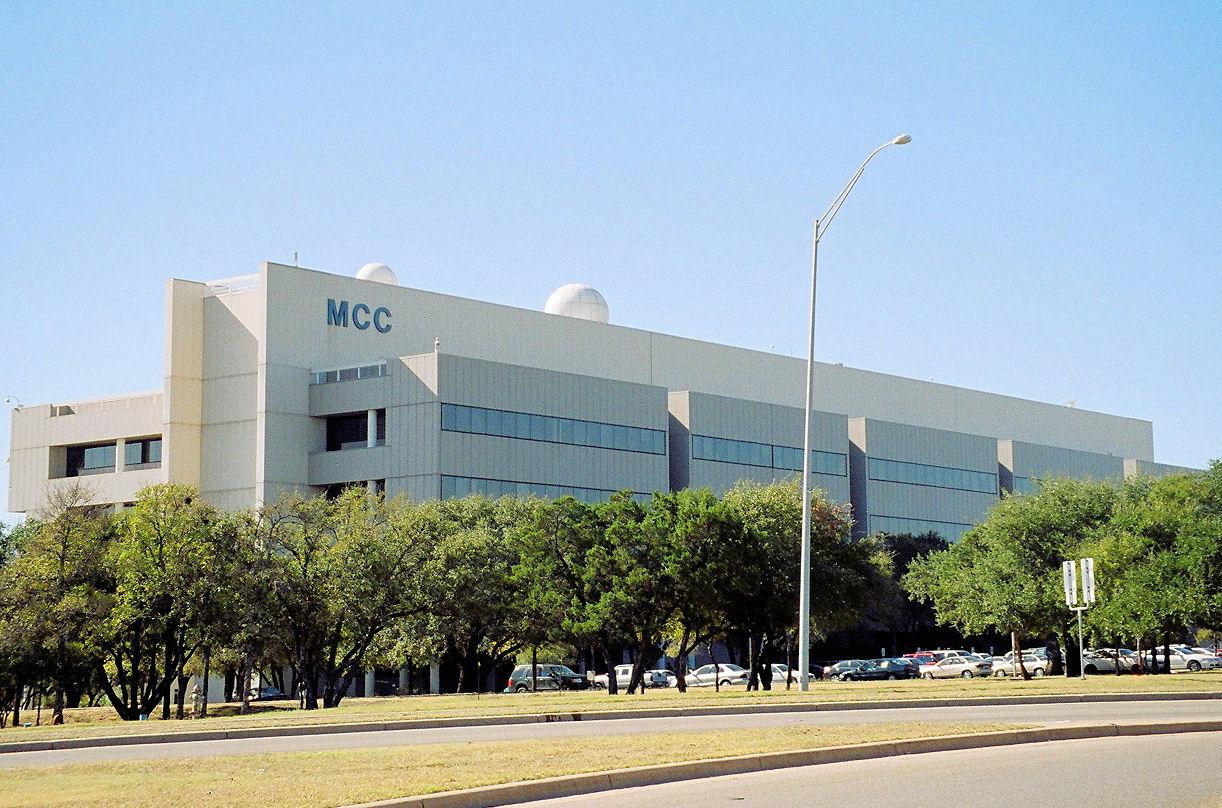
The former MCC headquarters building in Austin, Texas

Microelectronics and Computer Technology Corporation, originally the Microelectronics and Computer Consortium and widely seen by the acronym MCC, was the first, and at one time one of the largest, computer industry research and development consortia in the United States. MCC ceased operations in 2000 and was formally dissolved in 2004.

== Divisions ==
MCC did research and development in the following areas:

- System Architecture and Design (optimise hardware and software design, provide for scalability and interoperability, allow rapid prototyping for improved time-to-market, and support the re-engineering of existing systems for open systems).
- Advanced Microelectronics Packaging and Interconnection (smaller, faster, more powerful, and cost-competitive).
- Hardware Systems Engineering (tools and methodologies for cost-efficient, up-front design of advanced electronic systems, including modelling and design-for-test techniques to improve cost, yield, quality, and time-to-market).
- Environmentally Conscious Technologies (process control and optimisation tools, information management and analysis capabilities, and non-hazardous material alternatives supporting cost-efficient production, waste minimisation, and reduced environmental impact).
- Distributed Information Technology (managing and maintaining physically distributed corporate information resources on different platforms, building blocks for the national information infrastructure, networking tools and services for integration within and between companies, and electronic commerce).
- Intelligent Systems (systems that "intelligently" support business processes and enhance performance, including decision support, data management, forecasting and prediction).

== History ==
The MCC was a response to the announcement of Japan's Fifth Generation Project, a large Japanese research project launched in 1982 aimed at producing a new kind of computer by 1991. The Japanese had formed similar industrial research consortia as early as 1956. Many European and American computer companies saw this new Japanese initiative as an attempt to take full control of the world's high-end computer market, and MCC was created, in part, as a defensive move against that threat.

In late 1982, several major computer and semiconductor manufacturers in the United States banded together and founded MCC under the leadership of Admiral Bobby Ray Inman, whose previous positions had been Director of the National Security Agency and deputy director of the Central Intelligence Agency. Such formations were illegal in the United States until the 1984 Congressional passage of the "National Cooperative Research Act".

Several sites with relevant universities were considered, including Atlanta, Georgia (Georgia Tech), the Research Triangle, N.C. (UNC), the Washington, D.C. area (George Mason), Stanford University and Austin, Texas (UT) which was the final selection. The University of Texas offered land upon which they would construct a new building specifically designed for the MCC within their Austin campus. Ross Perot also offered the use of his private plane for 2 years for staff recruitment. Austin was selected as the site for MCC in 1983.

Despite this purpose and the background of Inman and his senior staff, MCC accepted no government funding for many years and was a refuge for some avoiding work on Strategic Defense Initiative projects. MCC was part of the Artificial Intelligence boom of the 1980s, reportedly the single largest customer of both Symbolics and Lisp Machines, Inc. (and like Symbolics, was one of the first companies to register a .com domain). In the 1980s its major programs were packaging, software engineering, CAD, and advanced computer architectures. The latter comprised artificial intelligence, human interface, database, and parallel processing, the latter two merging in the late 1980s.

Many of the early shareholder companies were mainframe computer companies under stress in the 1980s. Over the years, MCC's membership diversified to include a broad range of high-profile corporations involved in information technology products, as well as government research and development agencies and leading universities.

In June, 2000 the MCC Board of Directors voted to dissolve the consortium, and the few remaining employees held a wake at Scholz's Beer Garden in Austin on October 25. Formal dissolution papers were reportedly not filed until 2004.

== Spinoffs ==
While multiple technologies were transferred to member companies and government agencies in the final years, fourteen companies were spun out of MCC. Those spinoffs include:

1. TeraVicta Technologies, Austin's first MEMS company; its focus was to develop microscopic switch technology for fiber optic switching and radiofrequency switching in mobile phones specifically to dynamically switch between the future 3G-4GLTE-future5G wireless communication frequencies and ensure mobile phones were communicating over the strongest wireless signal to reduce dropped calls. Robert Miracky was the founding CEO who spun out the first commercial metal micromachining technology developed by MCC researchers Brent Lunceford, Jason Reed, Richard Nelson, K.Hu, and C. Hilbert in a collaborative development program with IBM in a novel implementation and operational paradigm for solid-state integrated circuit coolers integrated with conductive MEMS switches. TeraVicta was liquidated under Chapter 7 bankruptcy proceedings in 2015. The Austin region subsequently built up a MEMS & Sensors value chain in the billions of dollars comprising companies such as 3M, Cypress Semiconductor, NXP Semiconductor, Cirrus Logic, Silicon Labs, and the Austin division of the now-defunct Silicon Valley Technology Center.
2. Portelligent, a company that provides reverse engineering teardown services. At the time, Portelligent was the first company to commercialize such services; they had been provided by MCC to its member companies. Today, there are at least twelve companies worldwide that sell reports known as "reverse engineering teardown reports." Modern day teardown reports provide detailed information about technology products such as the bill of materials, microchip, and printed circuit board design specifics, manufacturing details including manufacturing location details for the entire value chain responsible for making electronics, including the iPhone and Samsung Galaxy smartphones. Portelligent was acquired by CMP Technology in 2007.
3. Evolutionary Technologies International, a company focused on developing database tools and data warehousing. It was spun off from MCC in 1990.

== See also ==
- Cyc
- Sematech, a semiconductor-industry focused consortium, previously in Austin; moved to Albany, NY in 2010

== Notes ==
1. Microelectronics and Computer Technology Corporation, entry from The Free On-line Dictionary of Computing.
2. David V. Gibson and Everett M. Rogers, R&D Collaborations On Trial, Harvard Business School Press, 1994, ISBN 0-87584-364-6, Introduction, p. 15.
3. David V. Gibson and Everett M. Rogers (1994), Chapter 7.
