= Traveling-wave parametric amplifier =

Amplifier for weak microwave signals

Rendering of a Josephson Traveling Wave Parametric Amplifier consisting of superconducting Josephson junctions, a meandering coplanar waveguide, and air bridges.

A traveling-wave parametric amplifier (TWPA) is a device that uses a nonlinear transmission line driven by a strong pump tone to amplify weak microwave signals. In a TWPA, parametric amplification of microwaves occurs continuously along a transmission line embedded with non-linear elements, giving them a broad bandwidth, typically several GHz wide. TWPAs enable detection of a wide range of microwave signals, including those from readout of superconducting qubits, and in forms of dark matter detection.

This amplifier is based on parametric amplification of microwaves traveling through a transmission line with embedded non-linear elements. TWPAs are an ultra low noise amplifier, as the probe tone contains only a few photons. They often act as quantum amplifiers because they operate near the quantum noise limit.

Due to their ability to operate at ultra-low noise, TWPAs are commonly used in quantum computing for readout of solid-state qubits like superconducting qubits and spin qubits, as elements of a quantum computer.

== History ==
The first TWPA designs were proposed in the 1970s. In the 1980s, Bernard Yurke showed that Josephson junction based amplification could reach near-quantum-limited noise levels. However, nonlinear TWPAs were more complicated at the fabrication level than these resonant Josephson junction based amplifiers, because they required a long nonlinear medium.

By the 2000s, efforts to obtain single-shot and high fidelity readout of superconducting qubits renewed interest in experimentally realized parametric amplifiers. A circuit scheme for a resonant Josephson parametric amplifier was implemented in 2007. However, use of JPAs meant a bandwidth constraint, which motivated the development of non-linear TWPA devices instead, which can operate over a larger bandwidth. By the 2010s, nano fabrication techniques had improved enough that TWPAs were experimentally realized. In 2015, the first demonstration of near quantum-noise-limited TWPA device was achieved by Macklin et al.

Reducing noise in TWPAs is an ongoing research direction in circuit quantum electrodynamics. In theory, TWPAs could approach the standard quantum limit of noise. However, microwave chains incorporating TWPAs remain at least twice as large as the standard quantum limit.

== Operation ==
=== Parametric amplification ===
Photon picture of optical parametric amplification: A pump photon excites a virtual energy level whose decay is stimulated by a signal photon resulting in the emission of an identical second signal photon and an idler photon under conversion of energy and momentum.

In parametric amplifiers, pump photons combine with signal photons to produce amplified signal and idler photons. In these mixing processes, energy gets transferred from the pump frequency mode $f_p$, to the signal frequency mode $f_s$ via the creation of a third idler mode, $f_i$. This parametric amplification can occur via a non-degenerate three wave-mixing process (where $f_s$+ $f_i$ = $f_p$) or a degenerate four wave-mixing process (where $f_s$+ $f_i$ = 2$f_p$) .

In a TWPA, the parametric amplification occurs continuously along a transmission line rather than in a resonant cavity, which gives the TWPA its broad bandwidth.

=== Phase matching ===
In order to ensure gain will accumulate constructively, rather than interfere with each other, the pump, signal, and idler waves must maintain a fixed phase relationship. Meeting this requirement is known as phase matching.

One way of accomplishing this is through resonant phase matching, where an array of sub-wavelength resonators are implemented periodically along the transmission line. These resonators add a frequency-dependent phase shift that effectively slows down the pump wave, compensating for the natural dispersion mismatch.

== Implementations ==
The main difference between different implementations of TWPAs is the source of their non-linearity.

=== Josephson TWPAs (J-TWPAs) ===
Josephson TWPAs use the nonlinear Josephson junction as their source of nonlinearity. These devices consist of a chain of many Josephson junctions. As the signal propagates down the transmission line alongside the pump, it experiences gain at each junction. They are beneficial due to their broadband gain with no fixed gain-bandwidth product.

Because they require thousands of uniform Josephson junctions, J-TWPAs are complicated to fabricate.

=== Kinetic inductance TWPAs (KI-TWPAs) ===
Kinetic inductance TWPAs (KI-TWPAs) use the nonlinear kinetic inductance of a high-inductance superconducting film as the source of their nonlinearity. KI-TWPAs are not challenging to implement from a fabrication standpoint, since this nonlinearity is intrinsic.

KI-TWPAs are less sensitive to magnetic fields than JTWPAs, because of the high critical magnetic fields of the materials they are made of. They are therefore preferable for experiments that require applied magnetic fields, since magnetic fields can break the Josephson effect in J-TWPAs.

Kinetic inductance amplifiers suffer from long physical lengths, ranging from tens of centimeters to several meters long, which poses significant fabrication and experimental challenges.

== Applications ==
=== Readout of superconducting qubits ===
Readout of superconducting qubits involves detecting a microwave signal at the single-photon level. Because of their ability to amplify ultra weak microwave signals, TWPAs can be used to read out superconducting qubits. Because they are broadband, TWPAs can be used for multiplexing (i.e. the readout of many qubits at once).

In an experimental setup, TWPAs are placed inside of a dilution refrigerator, typically directly after the qubit and any circulators or isolators. After the TWPA, the signal may enter a HEMT amplifier at the 4K stage for further amplification.

=== Dark matter detection ===
The sensitivity of TWPAs allows them to be used for axionic dark matter detection. They are integrated into a haloscope, a resonant cavity immerse in a strong magnetic field, which, in theory, would allow converting of an axion into an observable photon via the inverse Primakoff effect. In this way, TWPAs can be used to detect the existence of axions in the 1–100 μeV mass range (which corresponds to GHz-frequency range, since 1 GHz=4.136 μeV).
