= Eiichi Goto =

Japanese computer scientist

- 後藤 英一
- Born: January 26, 1931; Shibuya, Tokyo, Japan
- Died: June 12, 2005 (aged 74)
- Education: University of Tokyo
- Awards: Asahi Prize (1959); Purple Ribbon Medal of Honor (1989)
- Scientific career
- Fields: Computer science
- Workplaces: University of Tokyo; Kanagawa University; Riken

Eiichi Goto (後藤 英一, Gotō Eiichi; January 26, 1931 – June 12, 2005) was a Japanese computer scientist, the builder of one of the first general-purpose computers in Japan.

== Biography ==
Goto was born on January 26, 1931, in Shibuya, Tokyo. After attending Seikei High School he went to Tokyo University, where he graduated in 1953. He continued his graduate studies at Tokyo in physics under the supervision of Hidetoshi Takahashi, earning his doctorate in 1962. He became a faculty member at Tokyo in 1959. In 1968, he became the chief scientist of the Information Science Laboratory at RIKEN, a position he held until 1991. However, he continued to hold a position at Tokyo University as well, becoming a full professor there in 1970. He retired from the University of Tokyo in 1990, and in 1991 he moved to Kanagawa University.

Goto was a visiting professor at the Massachusetts Institute of Technology in 1961. He was vice president of the International Federation for Information Processing from 1971 to 1974, and also served several times on the steering committee of the Information Processing Society of Japan.

Goto died on June 12, 2005, of complications of diabetes.

== Research ==
In 1954 while he was still a graduate student, Goto invented the parametron, a circuit element that combined a ferrite core with a capacitor to generate electrical oscillations whose timing could be controlled. This provided an alternative to the vacuum tube technology then in use for building computing devices. He completed the construction of the PC-1, one of the first general-purpose computers built in Japan, in 1958, using parametron-based logic. Soon afterwards, he proposed the Goto pair, a device related to the parametron. Parametrons continued to be used for computing in Japan until the 1960s when they gave way to transistors. The quantum flux parametron is a later improvement of the parametron, also by Goto, that uses superconducting Josephson junctions to improve both the speed and the energy consumption of these devices.

During his visit to MIT in 1961, Goto devised the first time-optimal solution to the firing squad synchronization problem, a problem of designing a cellular automaton in which all cells simultaneously fire, starting from an initial configuration with only one active cell.

In electron beam lithography, Goto's work included the development of double deflection tubes and variable shaping techniques. In the early 1970s, Goto's work on electron beam lithography led him to become interested in the ability of symbolic algebra systems to manipulate mathematical formulae. In order to implement these systems, Goto developed a new Lisp system called HLISP, in which he had introduced the innovative technique of hash consing to eliminate redundant memory usage by using a hash table to map duplicated values to the same position in memory. Goto's work in symbolic computing also included the development of FLATS, a specialized computer hardware system aimed at this problem.

Other topics in Goto's research included the search for magnetic monopoles and fractional electrical charges, computer graphics, memory devices based on cathode ray tubes, arbitrary-precision arithmetic, and the automated analysis of bubble chamber experiments.

== Awards and honors ==
Goto was one of the winners of the Asahi Prize in 1959 for his work on the parametron and the PC-1. He won the Okochi memorial Technology Prize in 1988, and in 1989 he was given the Purple Ribbon Medal of Honor by the Japanese government for his work on electron beam shaping.
