= Quantum flux parametron =

Digital logic implementation technology based on superconducting Josephson junctions

A typical QFP circuit diagram

A Quantum Flux Parametron (QFP) is a digital logic implementation technology based on superconducting Josephson junctions. QFPs were invented by Eiichi Goto at the University of Tokyo as an improvement over his earlier parametron based digital logic technology, which did not use superconductivity effects or Josephson junctions. The Josephson junctions on QFP integrated circuits to improve speed and energy efficiency enormously over the parametrons.

In some applications, the complexity of the cryogenic cooling system required is negligible compared to the potential speed gains. While his design makes use of quantum principles, it is not a quantum computing technology, gaining speed only through higher clock speeds.

Apart from the speed advantage over traditional CMOS integrated circuit design is that parametrons can be operated with zero energy loss (no local increase in entropy), making reversible computing possible. Low energy use and heat generation is critical in supercomputer design, where thermal load per unit volume has become one of the main limiting factors.

A related technology is the Rapid Single Flux Quantum digital logic.

== See also ==
- Superconducting computing – Logic circuitry that requires low temperatures to achieve superconductivity
