= Back action =

Back action may refer to:

- Back action (quantum), a quantum measurement effect
- Trigger (firearms) § Single action, a type of firearm mechanism
