= Advanced Technology Development Facility =

Semiconductor R&D company

- Type: Subsidiary
- Industry: Semiconductor, Nanotechnology
- Founded: 1988
- Headquarters: Austin, Texas; United States
- Key people: Dave Anderson (Director)
- Parent: SEMATECH
- Website: www.atdf.com

Advanced Technology Development Facility was a research and development foundry for the semiconductor industry. It began operations as a research plant for SEMATECH in 1988, but was reorganized as a for-profit subsidiary in July 2004.

== History ==
=== Founding and SEMATECH era ===
The Advanced Technology Development Facility (ATDF) began operations in 1988 as a research plant for SEMATECH, a consortium of leading global semiconductor companies based in Austin, Texas. It was established to help the U.S. semiconductor industry regain its competitive edge through collaborative research, development, and the sharing of manufacturing standards.

=== Independent subsidiary ===
In July 2004, SEMATECH reorganized its R&D wafer fab and associated analytical laboratories into an independent, for-profit subsidiary named Advanced Technology Development Facility Inc. (ATDF). The new subsidiary took possession of SEMATECH's 62,000-square-foot Class 1 cleanroom in Texas, which offered processing capabilities for both 200-mm and 300-mm diameter wafers, along with process characterization laboratories providing metrology and analytical services. ATDF served as a resource for the SEMATECH consortium under a service agreement while also offering a broad range of services to external customers and universities.

=== Acquisition and closure ===
In December 2007, ATDF was acquired by the Silicon Valley Technology Center (SVTC), a San Jose-based development foundry and recent spin-off of Cypress Semiconductor. Following the acquisition, the combined entity was renamed SVTC Technologies. The merged organization aimed to serve more than 200 customers worldwide by expanding secure semiconductor and nanotechnology development capabilities. SVTC Technologies ultimately ceased operations and executed a general assignment for the benefit of creditors in October 2012.

== Programs and initiatives ==
=== Nanoelectronic Workforce Development Initiative ===
In March 2006, ATDF, together with Austin Community College, launched the Nanoelectronic Workforce Development Initiative, an internship program for college students interested in nanotechnology. The program provided training in nanotech research and development at ATDF's fabrication facility to Texas students in two-year technical, undergraduate, and graduate studies. The initiative was funded with a state grant jointly administered by Austin Community College and SEMATECH.

=== Technology Innovation Showcase Award ===
ATDF received a Technology Innovation Showcase Award at SEMICON West for its pioneering Nanopattern test wafer during a public presentation on the product's applications.

== See also ==
- List of companies based in Austin, Texas
