= Parametron =

Logic circuit element

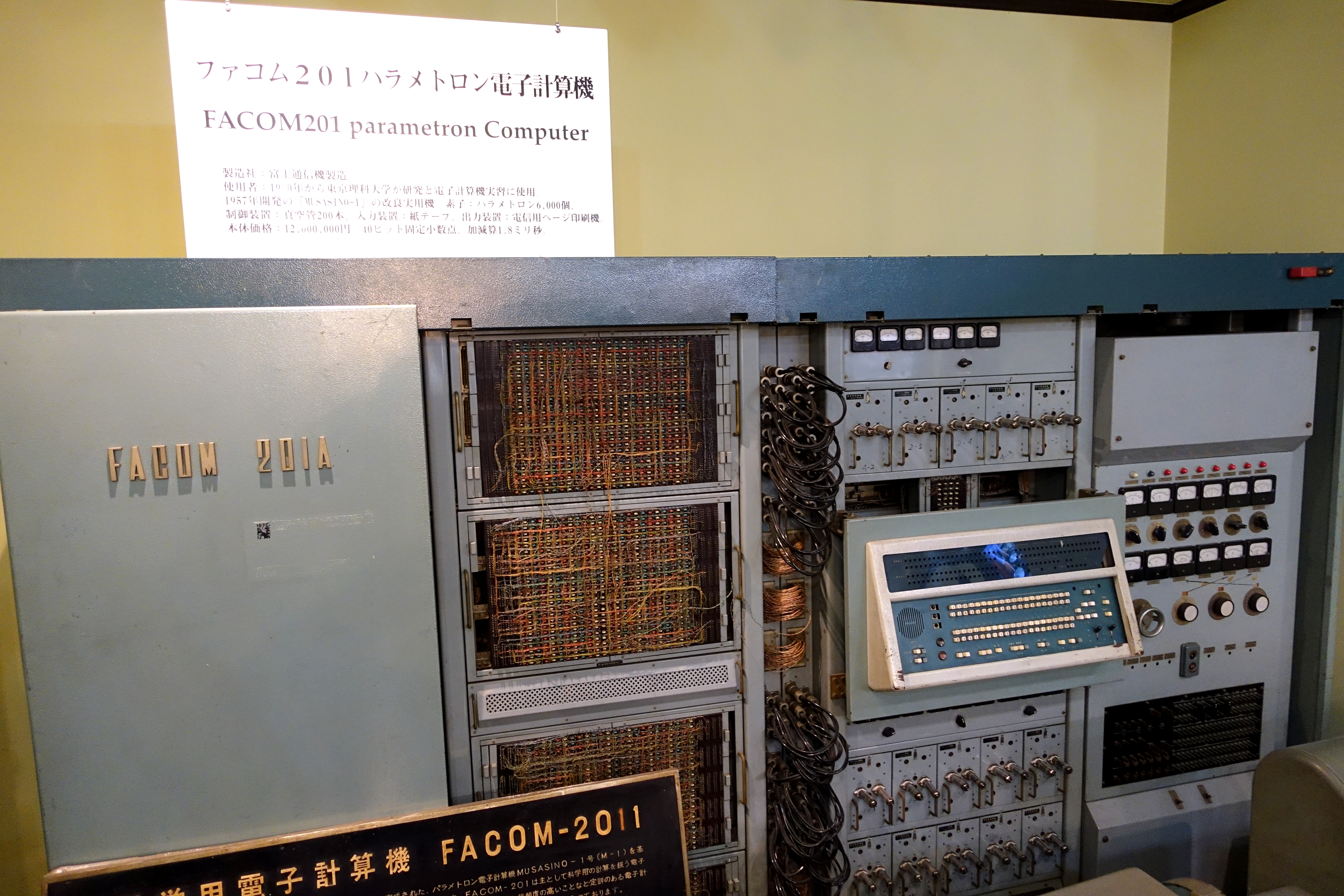
A Fujitsu FACOM 201 parametron computer in the Science Museum of the Tokyo University of Science

The parametron is a logic circuit element invented by Eiichi Goto in 1954. The parametron is essentially a resonant circuit with a nonlinear reactive element which oscillates at half the driving frequency. The oscillation can be made to represent a binary digit by the choice between two stationary phases π radians (180 degrees) apart.

Parametrons were used in early Japanese computers from 1954 through the early 1960s. A prototype parametron-based computer, the PC-1, was built at the University of Tokyo in 1958 and later recognized as part of the IEEE Milestone for the parametron. Parametrons were used in early Japanese computers due to being reliable and inexpensive but were ultimately surpassed by transistors due to differences in speed.

== See also ==
- Quantum flux parametron – Digital logic implementation technology based on superconducting Josephson junctions
- Eiichi Goto – Japanese computer scientist
- MUSASINO-1 – Early electronic digital computer built in Japan
- Magnetic amplifier – Electromagnetic device
- Magnetic logic – Digital logic based on non-linear magnetic effects
- Parametric oscillator – Harmonic oscillator whose parameters oscillate in time
