= Quantum noise =

Quantum effect of uncertainty

Quantum noise is any noise arising from quantum mechanical phenomena such as field quantization or the uncertainty principle. Quantum noise differs from classical noise fundamentally not only in the kinds of phenomena from which it arises, but also in key characteristic features such as its spectral density and temperature dependence.

For example, the uncertainty principle says that some groups of observables cannot simultaneously be known with arbitrary precision. As a result, measuring one observable to some precision can actually impose a limit on how precisely another observable can be known. Even for a system in its ground state -- at zero temperature -- this quantum indeterminacy can cause fluctuations in measured observable quantities. Such fluctuations are known as zero-point energy fluctuations.

Quantum noise can also come from the discrete nature of the components of flowing currents approximated as continuous, such as electrons and photons. An example of this form of quantum noise is shot noise as coined by J. Verdeyen which comes from the discrete arrival of photons or electrons in a detector. Because these quanta arrive randomly in time, even a perfectly steady current or light beam exhibits fluctuations in the detected signal.

In most systems, classical noise dominates over quantum noise. Under everyday environmental conditions, classical fluctuations are typically several orders of magnitude larger than quantum fluctuations, and thus mask their effect. Quantum noise generally only becomes visible after suppressing the effects of conventional noise sources such as thermal fluctuations, mechanical vibrations, and industrial noise by mechanically isolating a system, cooling it to a millikelvin range, and using extremely low-noise electronics for control and readout. This is why quantum noise is a major engineering problem in superconducting circuits and in the LIGO gravitational wave observatory, but not in many conventional settings. Even if all classical noise is eliminated, devices such as detectors and amplifiers will still be affected by quantum noise. As a result, experimental physicists define an "ideal" or "quantum-limited" amplifier or detector as one with only that noise which arises from quantum sources.

The term "quantum noise" is sometimes used in the fields of quantum information and quantum computing as an umbrella term for unwanted environmental disturbances that affect quantum systems and cause decoherence. An isolated quantum system, such as a qubit, has a state that will evolve deterministically. But in an open system, such as those found in nature, the qubit interacts with uncontrolled degrees of freedom in its environment, introducing fluctuations which are commonly referred to as quantum noise. This is distinct from the above definition, which specifically concerns intrinsic noise due to the nature of quantum mechanics, not all environmental sources of noise and decoherence. In practice, however, definitions of quantum noise often include environmental or external disturbances affecting quantum systems.

== Principles ==
=== Noise theory ===
A signal's noise is quantified as the Fourier transform of its autocorrelation. The autocorrelation of a signal is given as
$$G_{vv}(t-t') = \langle V(t)V(t')\rangle ,$$
which measures when our signal is positively, negatively or not correlated at different times $t$ and $t'$. The time average, $\langle V(t) \rangle$, is zero and our $V(t)$ is a voltage signal. Its Fourier transform is
$$V(\omega) = \frac{1}{\sqrt{T}}\int_{0}^{T} V(t)e^{i\omega t}dt$$
because we measure a voltage over a finite time window. The Wiener–Khinchin theorem generally states that a noise's power spectrum is given as the autocorrelation of a signal, i.e.,
$$S_{vv}(\omega) = \int_{-\infty}^{+\infty}e^{i\omega t} G_{vv}dt = \int_{-\infty}^{+\infty}e^{i\omega t} \langle |V(\omega)|^2\rangle dt$$
The above relation is sometimes called the power spectrum or spectral density. In the above outline, we assumed that

- Our noise is stationary or the probability does not change over time. Only the time difference matters.
- Noise is due to a very large number of fluctuating charge so that the central limit theorem applied, i.e., the noise is Gaussian or normally distributed.
- $G_{vv}$ decays to zero rapidly over some time $\tau_c$.
- We sample over a sufficiently large time, $T$, that our integral scales as a random walk $\sqrt{T}$. So our $V(\omega)$ is independent of measured time for $T \gg \tau_c$.
  Said in another way, $G_{vv}(t-t') \to 0$ as $|t-t'| \gg \tau_c$.

One can show that an ideal "top-hat" signal, which may correspond to a finite measurement of a voltage over some time, will produce noise across its entire spectrum as a sinc function. Even in the classical case, noise is produced.

==== Classical to quantum noise ====
To study quantum noise, one replaces the corresponding classical measurements with quantum operators, e.g.,
$$S_{xx}(\omega) = \int_{-\infty}^{+\infty}e^{i\omega t} \langle \hat{x}(t) \hat{x}(0) \rangle dt ,$$
where $\langle \cdot \rangle$ are the quantum statistical average using the density matrix in the Heisenberg picture.

=== Heisenberg microscope ===
Quantum noise can be illustrated by considering a Heisenberg microscope where an atom's position is measured from the scattering of photons. The uncertainty principle is given as,

$$\Delta x_{imp} \Delta p_{BA} \gtrsim \hbar.$$

Where the $\Delta x_{imp}$ is the uncertainty in an atom's position, and the $\Delta p_{BA}$ is the uncertainty of the momentum or sometimes called the backaction (momentum transferred to the atom) when near the quantum limit. The precision of the position measurement can be increased at the expense of knowing the atom's momentum. When the position is precisely known enough backaction begins to affect the measurement in two ways. First, it will impart momentum back onto the measuring devices in extreme cases. Secondly, we have decreasing future knowledge of the atom's future position. Precise and sensitive instrumentation will approach the uncertainty principle at sufficiently control environments.

=== Heisenberg uncertainty and noise ===
The Heisenberg uncertainty implies the existence of noise. An operator with a hermitian conjugate follows the relationship, $A A^{\dagger} \ge 0$. Define $A$ as $A = \delta x +\lambda e^{i\theta}\delta y$ where $\lambda$ is real. The $x$ and $y$ are the quantum operators. We can show the following,

$$\langle \delta x^2 \rangle  \langle \delta y^2 \rangle \ge \frac{1}{4} |\langle [\delta x, \delta y]\rangle|^2  + |\langle [\delta x, \delta y]_+ \rangle|^2$$
where the $\langle \cdot \rangle$ are the averages over the wavefunction and other statistical properties. The left terms are the uncertainty in $x$ and $y$, the second term on the right is to covariance or $\langle \delta x \delta y + \delta y \delta x \rangle$ which arises from coupling to an external source or quantum effects. The first term on the right corresponds to the Commutator relation and would cancel out if the x and y commuted. That is the origin of our quantum noise.

It is demonstrative to let $x$ and $y$ correspond to position and momentum that meets the well known commutator relation, $[x,p]=i\hbar$. Then our new expression is,

$$\Delta x \Delta y \ge \sqrt{\frac{1}{4} \hbar^2 + \sigma_{xy}^2 }$$

Where the $\sigma_{xy}$ is the correlation. If the second term on the right vanishes, then we recover the Heisenberg uncertainty principle.

=== Harmonic motion and weakly coupled heat bath ===
Consider the motion of a simple harmonic oscillator with mass, $M$, and frequency, $\Omega$, coupled to some heat bath which keeps the system in equilibrium. The equations of motion are given as,

$$x(t) = x(0)\cos(\Omega t) + p(0)\frac{1}{M\Omega}\sin(\Omega t)$$

The quantum autocorrelation is then,

$$\begin{align}
G_{xx} &= \langle \hat{x}(t) \hat{x}(0) \rangle \\
& = \langle \hat{x}(0) \hat{x}(0) \rangle \cos(\Omega t) + \langle \hat{p}(0)\hat{x}(0)\rangle \sin(\Omega t)
\end{align}$$

Classically, there is no correlation between position and momentum. The uncertainty principle requires the second term to be nonzero. It goes to $i\hbar/2$. We can take the equipartition theorem or the fact that in equilibrium the energy is equally shared among a molecule/atoms degrees of freedom in thermal equilibrium, i.e.,

$$\frac{1}{2}M\Omega^2 \langle x^2\rangle = \frac{1}{2}k_\text{B} T$$

In the classical autocorrelation, we have

$$G_{xx} = \frac{k_\text{B}T}{M\Omega^2}\cos(\Omega t)
\to
S_{xx}(\omega) = \pi \frac{k_\text{B} T}{M\Omega^2}[\delta(\omega - \Omega) +\delta(\omega +\Omega)]$$

while in the quantum autocorrelation we have

$$G_{xx} = \left( \frac{\hbar}{2M\Omega}\right) \left\{n_{BE}(\hbar\Omega) e^{i\Omega t} + [ n_{BE}(\hbar \Omega) +1 ]e^{-i\Omega t}  \right \}
\to
S_{xx}(\omega) = 2\pi \left( \frac{\hbar}{2M\Omega}\right)  [n_{BE}(\hbar \Omega)\delta(\omega - \Omega) +[n_{BE}(\hbar \Omega)+1]\delta(\omega +\Omega)]$$

Where the fraction terms in parentheses is the zero-point energy uncertainty. The $n_{BE}$ is the Bose-Einstein population distribution. Notice that the quantum $S_{xx}$ is asymmetric in the due to the imaginary autocorrelation. As we increase to higher temperature that corresponds to taking the limit of $k_BT \gg \hbar\Omega$. One can show that the quantum approaches the classical $S_{xx}$. This allows $n_{BE} \approx n_{BE}+1 \approx \frac{k_\text{B}T}{\hbar \Omega}$

==== Physical interpretation of spectral density ====
Typically, the positive frequency of the spectral density corresponds to the flow of energy into the oscillator (for example, the photons' quantized field), while the negative frequency corresponds to the emitted of energy from the oscillator. Physically, an asymmetric spectral density would correspond to either the net flow of energy from or to our oscillator model.

=== Linear gain and quantum uncertainty ===
Most optical communications use amplitude modulation where the quantum noise is predominantly the shot noise. A laser's quantum noise, when not considering shot noise, is the uncertainty of its electric field's amplitude and phase. That uncertainty becomes observable when a quantum amplifier preserves phase. The phase noise becomes important when the energy of the frequency modulation or phase modulation is comparable to the energy of the signal (frequency modulation is more robust than amplitude modulation due to the additive noise intrinsic to amplitude modulation).

==== Linear amplification ====
An ideal noiseless gain cannot exist. Consider the amplification of stream of photons, an ideal linear noiseless gain, and the Energy-Time uncertainty relation.

$$\Delta E \Delta t \gtrsim \hbar/2$$

The photons, ignoring the uncertainty in frequency, will have an uncertainty in its overall phase and number, and assume a known frequency, i.e., $\Delta \phi = 2\pi \nu \Delta t$ and $\Delta E = h\nu\Delta n$. We can substitute these relations into our energy-time uncertainty equation to find the number-phase uncertainty relation or the uncertainty in the phase and photon numbers.
$$\Delta n \Delta \phi > 1/2$$

Let an ideal linear noiseless gain, $G$, act on the photon stream. We also assume a unity quantum efficiency, or every photon is converted to a photocurrent. The output will be following with no noise added.

$$n_0 \pm \Delta n_0 \to Gn_0 \pm G\Delta n_0$$

The phase will be modified too,

$$\phi_0 \pm \Delta\phi_0 \to  \phi_0 +\theta + \Delta\phi_0 ,$$
where the $\theta$ is the overall accumulated phase as the photons traveled through the gain medium. Substituting our output gain and phase uncertainties, gives us
$$\Delta n_0 \Delta \phi_0 > 1/2G .$$

Our gain is $G>1$, which is a contradiction to our uncertainty principles. So a linear noiseless amplifier cannot increase its signal without noise. A deeper analysis done by H. Heffner showed the minimum noise power output required to meet the Heisenberg uncertainty principle is given as
$$P_n = h \nu B (G-1)$$
where $B$ is half of the full width at half max, the $\nu$ frequency of the photons, and $h$ is the Planck constant. The term $h\nu B_0/2$ with $B_0 = 2 B$ is sometimes called quantum noise

== Examples ==
=== Shot noise ===
The quantum principle of wave-particle duality means that flows that seem continuous at a macroscopic scale are actually made of discrete components when examined at small enough scales. For example, electrical current is made of individual electrons and light is made of individual photons. As a result, the number of constituent particles received in any given time interval from even an ideal source with constant average flow will be random with a Poisson distribution.

An experiment by S. Saraf, et .al. demonstrated shot noise limited measurements as a demonstration of quantum noise measurements. Generally speaking, they amplified a Nd:YAG free space laser with minimal noise addition as it transitioned from linear to nonlinear amplification. The experiment required Fabry-Perot for filtering laser mode noises and selecting frequencies, two separate but identical probe and saturating beams to ensure uncorrelated beams, a zigzag slab gain medium, and a balanced detector for measuring quantum noise or shot-noise limited noise.

==== Shot Noise Power ====
The theory behind noise analysis of photon statistics (sometimes called the forward Kolmogorov equation) starts from the Masters equation from Shimoda et al.

$$\frac{dP_n}{dx} = a[nP_{n-1}-(n+1)P_n] + b[(n+1)P_{n+1}-nP_n]$$

where $a$ corresponds to the emission cross section and upper population number product $\sigma_e N_2$, and the $b$ is the absorption cross section $\sigma_a N_1$. The above relation is describing the probability of finding $n$ photons in radiation mode $|n \rangle$. The dynamic only considers neighboring modes $| n+1 \rangle$ and $| n-1\rangle$ as the photons travel through a medium of excited and ground state atoms from position $x$ to $x+dx$. This gives us a total of 4 photon transitions associated to one photon energy level. Two photon number adding to the field and leaving an atom, $|n-1 \rangle \to | n \rangle$ and $|n \rangle \to |n+1 \rangle$ and two photons leaving a field to the atom $|n+1 \rangle \to |n \rangle$ and $|n \rangle \to |n-1 \rangle$. Its noise power is given as,

$$P_d^2 = P_\text{shot}^2 [1+2f_{sp}\eta(G-1)]$$

Where,

- $P_d$ is the power at the detector,
- $P_\text{shot}$ is the power limited shot noise,
- $G$ the unsaturated gain and is also true for saturated gain,
- $\eta$ is the efficiency factor. That is the product of transmission window efficiency to our photodetector, and quantum efficiency.
- $f_{sp}$ is the spontaneous emission factor that typically corresponds relative strength of spontaneous emission to stimulated emission. A value of unity would mean all doped ions are in the excited state.

Sarif, et al. demonstrated quantum noise or shot noise limited measurements over a wide range of power gain that agreed with theory.

=== Quantum Back Action ===
Back action is the phenomenon in which the act of measuring a property of a particle directly influences the state of the particle.

In quantum mechanics, operators which do not commute are considered incompatible observables, and carry an associated uncertainty principle:

$\sigma_x\sigma_p\geq\hbar/2$

When measuring these observables, this principle sets a minimum uncertainty in their values.

Each observable operator has a set of eigenstates. The initial state of a system, described by the wavefunction, is a linear combination of the full set of its eigenstates. Once measured, the system's wavefunction collapses to an eigenstate of that observable. It will then evolve in time again. Because the act of measurement altered the state of the observable, it affects the future behavior and any future measurement of the system. This introduces error, and is the concept behind back action.

Back action is a practical source of noise in experiments. Whenever a probe or measurement device interacts with a system, through photons, electrons, or other carriers, ithe measurement process imparts a random disturbance. In precision instruments, this disturbance appears as an additional noise source that limits sensitivity, known as measurement back-action noise.

Experimental setups involving optical measurement are limited by both shot noise and backaction noise. In an optomechanical system such as a laser interferometer, measurement back-action noise arises because of fluctuations in the radiation pressure of the light. By increasing the optical power, the shot noise is decreased, but this comes at the cost of increasing backaction, in the form of quantum radiation pressure noise, and the backaction of the randomly-arriving photons’ radiation pressure will become the dominant force on the system.

==== Experimental suppression using reflective boundaries ====
A study published in Physical Review Research (2025) by scientists at Swansea University demonstrated a novel method of suppressing quantum noise using reflective boundaries. By placing a nanoparticle at the focal center of a hemispherical mirror, researchers found that the particle became indistinguishable from its mirror image under specific conditions. This configuration prevented extraction of positional information from scattered light, which in turn eliminated the associated quantum back action, the disturbance caused by measurement using photons.

This counterintuitive effect occurred precisely when light scattering was maximized, suggesting a fundamental link between information availability and quantum noise. The study opened avenues for highly sensitive quantum sensors, macroscopic quantum state experiments, and applications in space-based quantum physics missions such as MAQRO (Macroscopic Quantum Resonators).

=== Vacuum Fluctuations / Zero-Point Noise ===
In classical mechanics, it is generally assumed that the theoretical lowest energy state of any given system contains identically zero kinetic and potential energy. However, an object with exactly zero kinetic energy must have a momentum of exactly zero and an unchanging position. Due to the uncertainty relationship between momentum and position, in quantum mechanics such a situation is impossible. Therefore the lowest energy state of a quantum system is always greater than zero, even for free space at zero temperature. This was noted early on in non-relativistic quantum mechanics for the specific case of the quantum harmonic oscillator by Planck, Einstein, and Stern. However, in quantum field theory it was later realized that the expectation values of certain observables are nonzero even in empty vacuum. There is also an uncertainty relationship between energy and time, which leads to energy fluctuations in quantum systems. These fluctuating zero-point vacuum fields can couple into other systems, acting as a uniquely quantum noise source.

In particular, vacuum fluctuations of the electromagnetic field are predicted to couple into qubits and contribute to decoherence. Vacuum fluctuations are also interpreted as the cause of spontaneous emission of energy from atomic systems and the Lamb shift in hydrogen energy levels, and the Casimir force. Thus, vacuum fluctuations give rise to several important physical effects and could potentially limit qubit lifetimes.

=== Noise from Quantum Tunneling ===
Storing information or performing computations often relies on separation of states by a potential energy barrier. Classically, such a barrier may be overcome at finite temperatures due to thermal noise adding kinetic energy to the system, destroying the state. However, if the system could be cooled to 0 K, thermal noise would theoretically vanish. In quantum mechanics, however, a potential energy barrier can be spontaneously tunneled through even at 0 K. This quantum effect introduces state-destroying noise that cannot be eliminated.

Although theoretically on solid ground, it was initially unclear whether quantum tunneling could practically be observed in macroscopic systems. In 1985, Michel Devoret, John M. Martinis, and John Clarke published a paper demonstrating quantum tunneling in a Josephson junction, a fundamental component of many quantum computing and superconducting classical computing systems. This work won the Nobel prize in physics in 2025.

=== Noise in Quantum Amplifiers ===
A laser is described by the coherent state of light, or the superposition of harmonic oscillators eigenstates. Erwin Schrödinger first derived the coherent state for the Schrödinger equation to meet the correspondence principle in 1926.

The laser is a quantum mechanical phenomena (see Maxwell–Bloch equations, rotating wave approximation, and semi-classical model of a two level atom). The Einstein coefficients and the laser rate equations are adequate if one is interested in the population levels and one does not need to account for population quantum coherences (the off diagonal terms in a density matrix). Photons of the order of 10^{8} corresponds to a moderate energy. The relative error of measurement of the intensity due to the quantum noise is on the order of 10^{−5}. This is considered to be of good precision for most of applications.

A quantum amplifier is an amplifier which operates close to the quantum limit. Quantum noise becomes important when a small signal is amplified. A small signal's quantum uncertainties in its quadrature are also amplified; this sets a lower limit to the amplifier. A quantum amplifier's noise is its output amplitude and phase. Generally, a laser is amplified across a spread of wavelengths around a central wavelength, some mode distribution, and polarization spread. But one can consider a single mode amplification and generalize to many different modes. A phase-invariant amplifier preserves the phase of the input gain without drastic changes to the output phase mode.

Quantum amplification can be represented with a unitary operator, $A_\text{out} = U^{\dagger} A_\text{in} U$ , as stated in D. Kouznetsov 1995 paper.

== See also ==
- Quantum error correction
- Quantum optics
- Quantum limit
- Shot noise
- Quantum harmonic oscillator

== Sources ==
- Clark, Aashish A. (2008). "Quantum Noise and quantum measurement" (PDF). Oxford University Press.
- Clerk, A. A.; Devoret, M. H.; Girvin, S. M.; Marquardt, Florian; Schoelkopf, R. J. (2010). "Introduction to quantum noise, measurement, and amplification". Reviews of Modern Physics. 82 (2): 1155–1208. arXiv:0810.4729. Bibcode:2010RvMP...82.1155C. doi:10.1103/RevModPhys.82.1155.
- Gardiner, Crispin W.; Zoller, Peter (2004). Quantum Noise: A Handbook of Markovian and Non-Markovian Quantum Stochastic Methods with Applications to Quantum Optics (3rd ed.). Berlin ; Heidelberg: Springer. ISBN 978-3-540-22301-6.
