= PC-1 (computer) =

The Parametron Computer 1 (PC-1) was a binary, single-address computer developed at Professor Hidetosi Takahasi's Laboratory at the Department of Physics, University of Tokyo, and was one of the first general purpose computers that used parametron components and dual frequency magnetic-core memory. Construction started in September 1957 and was completed on March 26, 1958. The PC-1 was used at Takahasi's Laboratory for research related both to hardware and software and the researchers in the Faculty of Science also used it for scientific computing. The PC-1 was retired in May 1964.

The arithmetic and control circuits of the PC–1 consisted of 4200 parametrons. Binary numbers were coded using the two's complement representation; a short number was coded using 18 bits and a long one using 36. The single-address instructions were 18 bits long and there were about 20 of them. The memory consisted of 512 short words. The clock frequency was 15 kHz. One addition or subtraction required 4 clock cycles; one multiplication 26 cycles for a short multiplier, or 44 cycles for a long multiplier. Division consumed 161 cycles and a store operation 8. The power consumption was 3 kW and the floor area required was 8 square meters. The input was done using a photoelectric paper tape reader; the output was provided by a teletype.
