= Quantum amplifier =

Amplifier that uses quantum mechanical methods

In physics, a quantum amplifier is an amplifier that uses quantum mechanical methods to amplify a signal; examples include the active elements of lasers and optical amplifiers.

The main figures of merit of a quantum amplifier are its gain and added noise. These parameters are not independent. In a linear amplifier, the higher the gain, the higher the added noise. In lasers, the added noise corresponds to the amplified spontaneous emission of the active medium. The unavoidable noise of quantum amplifiers is one of the reasons for the use of digital signals in optical communications and can be deduced from the fundamentals of quantum mechanics.

== Introduction ==
An amplifier increases the amplitude of its input. While classical amplifiers take in classical signals, quantum amplifiers take in quantum signals, such as coherent states. This does not necessarily mean that the output is a coherent state; indeed, typically it is not. The form of the output depends on the specific amplifier design. Besides amplifying the intensity of the input, quantum amplifiers can also increase the quantum noise present in the signal.

== Exposition ==
The physical electric field in a paraxial single-mode pulse can be approximated with superposition of modes; the electric field $~E_{\rm phys}~$ of a single mode can be described as

$$\vec E_{\rm phys}(\vec x)~=~ \vec e~ \hat a~ M(\vec x)~\exp(ikz-{\rm i}\omega t) ~+~ {\rm Hermitian~conjugate}~$$

where

- $~\vec x =\{x_1,x_2,z \}~$ is the spatial coordinate vector, with z being the propagation direction,
- $~\vec e ~$ is the polarization vector of the pulse,
- $~k~$ is the wave number in the z direction,
- $~\hat a~$ is the annihilation operator of the photon in a specific mode $~ M(\vec x) ~$.

The analysis of the noise in the system is made with respect to the mean value of the annihilation operator. To obtain the noise, one solves for the real and imaginary parts of the projection of the field to a given mode $~ M(\vec x) ~$. Spatial coordinates do not appear in the solution.

Denote the expectation value of the initial field as $~{\left\langle\hat a\right\rangle_{\rm initial}}~$. Physically, the initial state corresponds to the coherent pulse at the input of the optical amplifier; the final state corresponds to the output pulse. The amplitude-phase behavior of the pulse must be known, although only the quantum state of the corresponding mode is important. The pulse may be treated in terms of a single-mode field.

The action of a quantum amplifier is a unitary transform $\hat U$, acting on the initial state $~|{\rm initial}\rangle~$ and producing the amplified state $~|{\rm final}\rangle~$. In the Schrödinger representation, this is

$$~|{\rm final}\rangle = U |\rm initial \rangle$$

The amplification depends on the expectation value $~\langle \hat a\rangle ~$ of the field operator $~\hat a~$ and its dispersion $~\langle \hat a^\dagger \hat a\rangle - \langle \hat a^\dagger \rangle \langle \hat a\rangle~$. A coherent state is a state with minimal uncertainty; when the state is transformed, the uncertainty may increase. This increase can be interpreted as the added noise of the amplifier.

The gain $~G~$ is defined as follows:

$$G= \frac{\left\langle\hat a\right\rangle _{\rm final}}{\left\langle\hat a\right\rangle _{\rm initial}}$$

The can be written also in the Heisenberg representation; the changes are attributed to the amplification of the field operator. Thus, the evolution of the operator A is given by $~ \hat A =\hat U^\dagger \hat a \hat U~$, while the state vector remains unchanged. The gain is given by

$$~ G= \frac{\left\langle\hat A\right\rangle _{\rm initial}}{\left\langle\hat a\right\rangle _{\rm initial}}~$$

In general, the gain $~G~$ may be complex, and it may depend on the initial state. For laser applications, the amplification of coherent states is important. Therefore, it is usually assumed that the initial state is a coherent state characterized by a complex-valued initial parameter $~\alpha~$ such that $~~|{\rm initial}\rangle=|\alpha\rangle~$. Even with such a restriction, the gain may depend on the amplitude or phase of the initial field.

In the following, the Heisenberg representation is used; all brackets are assumed to be evaluated with respect to the initial coherent state.

$${\rm noise}= \langle \hat A^\dagger \hat A\rangle -\langle \hat A^\dagger \rangle\langle \hat A\rangle - \left(\langle \hat a^\dagger \hat a\rangle -\langle \hat a^\dagger \rangle\langle \hat a\rangle\right)$$

The expectation values are assumed to be evaluated with respect to the initial coherent state. This quantity characterizes the increase of the uncertainty of the field due to amplification. As the uncertainty of the field operator does not depend on its parameter, the quantity above shows how much output field differs from a coherent state.

== Linear phase-invariant amplifiers ==
Linear phase-invariant (also known as phase-insensitive or phase preserving) amplifiers may be described as follows. Assume that the unitary operator $~\hat U~$ amplifies in such a way that the input $~\hat a~$ and the output $~\hat A={\hat U}^\dagger \hat a \hat U~$ are related by a linear equation

$$~\hat A = c \hat a + s \hat b^\dagger,$$

where $~c~$ and $~s~$ are c-numbers and $~\hat b^\dagger~$ is a creation operator characterizing the amplifier. Without loss of generality, it may be assumed that $~c~$ and $~s~$ are real. The commutator of the field operators is invariant under unitary transformation $~\hat U~$:

$$\hat A\hat A^\dagger -\hat A^\dagger\hat A =\hat a\hat a^\dagger -\hat a^\dagger \hat a=1$$

From the unitarity of $~\hat U~$, it follows that $~ \hat b~$ satisfies the canonical commutation relations for operators with Bose statistics:

$$~\hat b\hat b^\dagger -\hat b^\dagger \hat b=1~$$

The c-numbers are then

$$~c^2 \!-\! s^2=1~$$

Hence, the phase-invariant amplifier acts by introducing an additional bosonic mode. The gain and added noise of this amplifier are

$$~~G\!=\!c~~$$

and

$$~~{\rm added~noise} =c^2\!-\!1.$$

The coefficient $~~ g\!=\!|G|^2~~$ is sometimes called the intensity amplification coefficient. The noise of the linear phase-invariant amplifier is given by $g-1$. The gain can be dropped by splitting the beam; the estimate above gives the minimal possible noise of the linear phase-invariant amplifier.

The linear amplifier has an advantage over the multi-mode amplifier: if several modes of a linear amplifier are amplified by the same factor, the noise in each mode is determined independently;that is, modes in a linear quantum amplifier are independent.

To obtain a large amplification coefficient with minimal noise, one may use homodyne detection, constructing a field state with known amplitude and phase, corresponding to the linear phase-invariant amplifier. The uncertainty principle sets the lower bound of quantum noise in an amplifier. In particular, the output of a laser system and the output of an optical generator are not coherent states.

== Nonlinear amplifiers ==
Nonlinear amplifiers do not have a linear relation between their input and output. The maximum noise of a nonlinear amplifier cannot be much smaller than that of an idealized linear amplifier. This limit is determined by the derivatives of the mapping function; a larger derivative implies an amplifier with greater uncertainty. Examples include most lasers, which include near-linear amplifiers, operating close to their threshold and thus exhibiting large uncertainty and nonlinear operation. As with the linear amplifiers, they may preserve the phase and keep the uncertainty low, but there are exceptions. These include parametric oscillators, which amplify while shifting the phase of the input.
