= SVTC Technologies =

- Type: Private
- Industry: Semiconductor, MEMS, Nanotechnology, Microfluidics
- Founded: 2004
- Fate: Ceased operations October 15, 2012
- Headquarters: San Jose, CA; United States
- Key people: Bert Bruggeman (CEO)
- Services: Development, Production, Analytical Services, Wafer Services
- Divisions: San Jose, Austin

SVTC Technologies was a technology services company that provided development and commercialization services for semiconductor process-based technologies and products. SVTC operated from 2004 to October 2012.

It operated facilities in San Jose, California and Austin, Texas. SVTC provided development and production services for MEMS, microfluidics, high voltage, and Through-silicon via (TSV) technologies. These technologies are used in a variety of industries including semiconductor, life sciences, aerospace and defense, consumer-mobility and clean energy.

SVTC Technologies' fabrication facilities included 8-inch (200 mm) CMOS and MEMS process tools as well as microscopy (Scanning electron microscope, Transmission electron microscopy, Atomic Force Microscope, Focused ion beam) and failure analysis equipment.

== History ==
SVTC Technologies began operations as a subsidiary of Cypress Semiconductor in 2004. At that time, it was named the Silicon Valley Technology Center. It spun out of Cypress Semiconductor's Fab 1 facility. It became a privately owned, independent company in 2007. SVTC is funded by Oakhill Capital Partners and Tallwood Venture Capital.

In December 2007, SVTC acquired the Advanced Technology Development Facility (ATDF), a subsidiary of SEMATECH. At that time, the name was changed to SVTC Technologies.

In May 2011, SVTC attained ISO 13485 certification which is targeted for next generation life science products. SVTC is also ITAR registered. ITAR is required for many defense applications.

SVTC closed down in October 2012. Per an e-mail from the company, SVTC "ceased operations and executed a general assignment for the benefit of creditors as of October 15, 2012".

== Grant from U.S. Department of Energy to build nation's first photovoltaic manufacturing development facility ==
On April 10, 2011, the United States Department of Energy (DOE) awarded SVTC Solar, a subsidiary of SVTC Technologies, $25 million in funding as a part of the DOE's SunShot Initiative. This grant supports the start-up of the first photovoltaics (PV) manufacturing development facility (MDF) in the U.S. to reduce the costs and development time for the PV industry.

On August 3, 2011, it was announced that the grant from the Department of Energy was increased to $30M. In addition, another $55M of equipment, materials and funding was committed by industry partners and customers bringing the total funding to $85M.

== The SunShot Initiative ==
The SunShot Initiative was launched to make large-scale photovoltaic solar energy systems competitive with other forms of energy and eliminate the industry's reliance on subsidies by the end of the decade. The initiative's goal of reducing the costs of PV solar systems to roughly six cents per kilowatt-hour will allow solar energy systems to be broadly deployed across the country. "The SunShot Initiative will not only keep the United States at the forefront in solar energy research and development, but will help us win the worldwide race to build a solar manufacturing industry that produces solar systems that are cost competitive with fossil fuels," said U.S. Secretary of Energy, Steven Chu.

The DOE program provides developers two access models: a consortium model patterned after the Semiconductor Manufacturing Technology (SEMATECH) effort of the 1980s, and a commercial model based on SVTC's Technology Development Process — a process that provides customers access to leading-edge technology and enables accelerated commercial development while protecting their valuable IP. The SVTC MDF will provide solar energy innovators access to PV technology: multi- and monocrystalline silicon PV, selective-emitter cells, back-contact cells, emitter wrap-through cells, PERC cells, PERL cells, thin-silicon, 3D cells and hybrid PV technologies.

== Aerospace and defense programs ==
MEMS and nanotechnology development for the Aerospace & Defense industry is on-going at SVTC Technologies. Advanced military and space systems utilize MEMS technology in the areas of infrared imaging devices, optical and electrical switching, displays, munitions, inertial navigation, laser communications, sensors, and night vision systems. Nanotechnology is used to integrate transistors from compound semiconductor technologies together with transistors on a wafer fabricated using a standard silicon CMOS foundry process. The compound semiconductor technologies provide much higher speed-breakdown voltages than CMOS transistors, while CMOS technology provides higher integration density for computation functions. The result is a 10× better power-to-performance improvement versus the equivalent silicon devices.
