= National Cooperative Research and Production Act =

National Cooperative Research and Production Act of 1993
- Long title: An Act to promote research and development, encourage innovation, stimulate trade, and make necessary and appropriate modifications in the operation of the antitrust laws.
- Acronyms (colloquial): NCRPA
- Enacted by: the 103rd United States Congress

Citations
- Public law: 103-42
- Statutes at Large: 107 Stat. 117

Legislative history
- Committee consideration by United States House Committee on Judiciary Judiciary; Economic and Commercial Law; Passed the 103rd House on 1993-05-18; Passed the Senate on 1993-05-28; Signed into law by President Bill Clinton on 1993-06-10

Major amendments
- Amended by the Standards Development Organization Advancement Act of 2004

The National Cooperative Research and Production Act (NCRPA, P.L. 103-42, 15 U.S.C. §§ 4301-4306) of 1993 is a United States federal law that reduces potential antitrust liabilities of research joint ventures (RJV) and standards development organizations (SDOs). The law was designed to promote innovation, facilitate trade, and strengthen the competitiveness of the United States in world markets by

1. clarifying the legal standards to be applied when determining whether such activities violate Federal antitrust laws,
2. providing for recovery of attorneys fees by the companies, and
3. limiting monetary damages in any antitrust suit brought under the Clayton Act to actual damages, interest, and reasonable attorney's fees.

The first two protections apply to all RJVs and SDOs, but the third only applies if they register with the Antitrust Division of the U.S. Department of Justice, which publishes them in The Federal Register.

The NCRPA replaced the earlier National Cooperative Research Act of 1984 (P.L. 98-462).

According to the text of the law:

(6) The term "joint venture" means any group of activities, including attempting to make, making, or performing a contract, by two or more persons for the purpose of—

(A) theoretical analysis, experimentation, or systematic study of phenomena or observable facts,

(B) the development or testing of basic engineering techniques,

(C) the extension of investigative findings or theory of a scientific or technical nature into practical application for experimental and demonstration purposes, including the experimental production and testing of models, prototypes, equipment, materials, and processes,

(D) the production of a product, process, or service,

(E) the testing in connection with the production of a product, process, or service by such venture,

(F) the collection, exchange, and analysis of research or production information, or

(G) any combination of the purposes specified in subparagraphs (A), (B), (C), (D), (E), and (F),

Full text: https://uscode.house.gov/view.xhtml?req=granuleid:USC-prelim-title15-chapter69-front&num=0&edition=prelim
