= Back action (quantum) =

In quantum mechanics, back action is the phenomenon in which the act of measuring a property of a particle directly influences the state of the particle. In all scientific measurement, there exists a degree of error due to various factors, such as unaccounted-for variables, imperfect procedures, or imperfect measurement devices.

In classical mechanics, it is assumed that the error of any experiment could theoretically be zero if all relevant aspects of the configuration are known and the measurement devices are perfect. However, quantum mechanical theory posits that the act of measuring a quantity, regardless of the degree of precision, carries inherent uncertainty because the measurement itself influences the quantity being measured. This behavior is known as back action, and it occurs because quantum uncertainty carries minimum fluctuations as a probability. For example, even objects at absolute zero still exhibit "motion" due to such quantum fluctuations.

== Simultaneous measurement and uncertainty ==
Simultaneous measurement is not possible in quantum mechanics for observables that do not commute (the commutator of the observables is not equal to zero). Since observable quantities are treated as operators, their values do not necessarily follow classical algebraic properties. For this reason, there always remains a minimum uncertainty in regard to the uncertainty principle. This relationship sets a minimum uncertainty when measuring position and momentum. However, it can be extended to any incompatible observables.

$$\sigma_x\sigma_p\geq\hbar/2$$

$$\sigma_A^2\sigma_B^2\geq |\left ( \frac{1}{2i} \right )\langle[\hat{A},\hat{B}]\rangle|^2$$

== Effect of measurement on system ==
Each observable operator has a set of eigenstates, each with an eigenvalue. The full initial state of a system is a linear combination of the full set of its eigenstates. Upon measurement, the state then collapses to an eigenstate with a given probability and will proceed to evolve over time after measurement. Thus, measuring a system affects its future behavior and will thus affect further measurements of non-commuting observables.

Using bra-ket notation, consider a given system that begins in a state $|\psi\rangle$, and an observable operator $\hat O$ with the set of eigenstates $\{|\omega_i\rangle\}$ each with a corresponding eigenvalue $\lambda_i$. A measurement of $\hat O$ is made, and the probability of getting $\lambda_i$ is as follows:

$$P(\lambda_i)=|\langle\omega_i|\psi\rangle|^2$$

The particle's state has now collapsed to the state $|\omega_i\rangle$. Now, consider another observable $\hat B$ with the set of eigenstates $\{|\varphi_i\rangle\}$ each with a corresponding eigenvalue $b_i$. If a subsequent measurement of $\hat B$ on the system is made, the possible outcomes are now $\{b_i\}$, each with the following probability:

$$P(b_i)=|\langle\varphi_i|\omega_i\rangle|^2$$

Had $\hat O$ not been measured first, the probability of each outcome would have remained as:

$$P(b_i)=|\langle\varphi_i|\psi\rangle|^2$$

Thus, unless $\hat B$ and $\hat O$ share and identical set of eigenstates (that is to say, $\{|\varphi_i\rangle\}=\{|\omega_i\rangle\}$), the initial measurement fundamentally influences the system to affect future measurements. This statement is identical to stating that if the commutator of the two observables is non-zero, repeated observations of the observables will present altered results. Observables will share the set of eigenstates if

$$[\hat O, \hat B] = 0$$

Back action is an area of active research. Recent experiments with nanomechanical systems have attempted to evade back action while making measurements.

== See also ==
- Quantum measurement
- Measurement problem
- Quantum decoherence
- Uncertainty principle
- Observable (quantum mechanics)
- Commutator
- Quantum nondemolition measurement
- Quantum noise
