= SEMATECH =

Defunct US semiconductor consortion (1987-2015)

- Type: Joint venture
- Industry: Semiconductor, Manufacturing
- Genre: Consortium
- Founded: 1987; 39 years ago
- Defunct: 2015
- Headquarters: Austin, Texas (1987-2007); Albany, New York (2007-2015)

SEMATECH (from Semiconductor Manufacturing Technology) was a not-for-profit consortium that performed research and development to advance chip manufacturing. SEMATECH involved collaboration between various sectors of the R&D community, including chipmakers, equipment and material suppliers, universities, research institutes, and government partners. SEMATECH's mission was to rejuvenate the U.S. semiconductor industry through collective R&D efforts, focused on improving manufacturing processes and introducing cutting-edge technologies.

The group was first funded by the U.S. Department of Defense through the Defense Advanced Research Projects Agency until 1997 and later by member dues. SEMATECH was moved from Austin, Texas to Albany, New York in 2007 after receiving state funding from the state of New York. The consortium was absorbed by SUNY Polytechnic University in 2015 after a long decline, leaving behind a mixed legacy.

== History ==
SEMATECH was conceived in 1986, formed in 1987, and began operating in Austin, Texas in 1988 as a partnership between the United States government and 14 U.S.-based semiconductor manufacturers to solve common manufacturing problems and regain competitiveness for the U.S. semiconductor industry that had been surpassed by Japanese industry in the mid-1980s. SEMATECH was funded over five years by public subsidies coming from the U.S. Department of Defense via the Defense Advanced Research Projects Agency (DARPA) for a total of $500 million. This represents about $1 billion in 2022 dollars or only 2 percent of the CHIPS investment.

Following a determination by SEMATECH Board of Directors to eliminate matching funds from the U.S. government after 1996, the organization's focus shifted from the U.S. semiconductor industry to the larger international semiconductor industry, abandoning the initial U.S. government-initiative. Its members represented about half of the worldwide chip market. In late 2015, SEMATECH transferred the Critical Materials Council (CMC), a membership group of semiconductor fabricators, to TECHCET CA LLC, an advisory service firm dedicated to providing supply-chain and market information on electronic materials. This group of procurement and quality managers continues to focus on anticipating and remedying materials supply-chain issues and focusing on best practices. The CMC is now an integral part of TECHCET's business and provides guidance on their work of Critical Materials Reports and CMC Conference activities.

== Technology focus ==
SEMATECH conducted research on the technical challenges and costs associated with developing new materials, processes, and equipment for semiconductor manufacturing. Advanced technology programs focus on EUV lithography including photomask blank and photoresist development, materials and emerging technologies for device structures, metrology, manufacturing, and environment and safety issues.

In 1989, the partnership spent a substantial amount of its resources to help the struggling GCA Corp., an equipment manufacturer being eclipsed by Japanese competitors. The initial investment helped the Massachusetts-based factory stay afloat, and even modernize, but failed to address the larger issue – a lack of demand.

In early 1993 the parent company of GCA Corp. tried to sell it. The latter closed its steppers factory in early 1993.

== College of Nanoscale Science and Engineering (CNSE) ==
In January 2003 SEMATECH and the University at Albany – State University of New York – established a major partnership to commercialize advanced semiconductor, nanotechnology and other emerging technologies.

Through its government-university-industry partnership with the State of New York and the College of Nanoscale Science and Engineering (CNSE) of the University at Albany, SEMATECH conducted programs in lithography and metrology at CNSE's Albany NanoTech Complex.

In 2010, SEMATECH expanded its cooperation with CNSE with the announcement that the ISMI would relocate its headquarters and operations to CNSE's Albany NanoTech Complex beginning in January 2011.

With over $6.5 billion in high-tech investments, CNSE's 800,000-square-foot (74,000 m^{2}) Albany NanoTech Complex features "the only fully integrated, 300 mm wafer, computer chip pilot prototyping and demonstration line within 80,000 square feet (7,400 m^{2}) of Class 1 capable cleanrooms".

== Location ==
SEMATECH had access to laboratories and development fabs in Austin, Texas (1987-2007) and Albany, New York (2007-2015).

== Industry participation ==
SEMATECH hosted a variety of worldwide conferences, symposiums, and workshops (e.g., Litho Forum, Manufacturing Week) and delivered papers, presentations, and joint reports at major industry conferences (SPIE, IEDM, SEMICON West).
