= Two-state vector formalism =

Description of quantum mechanics in which the present depends on both the past and future

The two-state vector formalism (TSVF) is a description of quantum mechanics in terms of a causal relation in which the present is caused by quantum states of the past and of the future taken in combination.

== Theory ==
The two-state vector formalism is one example of a time-symmetric interpretation of quantum mechanics (see Interpretations of quantum mechanics). Time-symmetric interpretations of quantum mechanics were first suggested by Walter Schottky in 1921, and later by several other scientists. The two-state vector formalism was first developed by Satosi Watanabe in 1955, who named it the Double Inferential state-Vector Formalism (DIVF). Watanabe proposed that information given by forwards evolving quantum states is not complete; rather, both forwards and backwards evolving quantum states are required to describe a quantum state: a first state vector that evolves from the initial conditions towards the future, and a second state vector that evolves backwards in time from future boundary conditions. Past and future measurements, taken together, provide complete information about a quantum system. Watanabe's work was later rediscovered by Yakir Aharonov, Peter Bergmann and Joel Lebowitz in 1964, who later renamed it the Two-State Vector Formalism (TSVF). Conventional prediction, as well as retrodiction, can be obtained formally by separating out the initial conditions (or, conversely, the final conditions) by performing sequences of coherence-destroying operations, thereby cancelling out the influence of the two state vectors.

The two-state vector is represented by:

$\langle\Phi| \ \ \ |\Psi\rangle$

where the state $\langle\Phi|$ evolves backwards from the future and the state $|\Psi\rangle$ evolves forwards from the past.

In the example of the double-slit experiment, the first state vector evolves from the electron leaving its source, the second state vector evolves backwards from the final location of the electron on the detection screen, and the combination of forwards and backwards evolving state vectors determines what occurs when the electron passes the slits.

The two-state vector formalism provides a time-symmetric description of quantum mechanics, and is constructed such as to be time-reversal invariant. It can be employed in particular for analyzing pre- and post-selected quantum systems. Building on the notion of two-state, Reznik and Aharonov constructed a time-symmetric formulation of quantum mechanics that encompasses probabilistic observables as well as nonprobabilistic weak observables.

== Relation to other work ==
In view of the TSVF approach, and in order to allow information to be obtained about quantum systems that are both pre- and post-selected, Yakir Aharonov, David Albert and Lev Vaidman developed the theory of weak values.

In TSVF, causality is time-symmetric; that is, the usual chain of causality is not simply reversed. Rather, TSVF combines causality both from the past (forward causation) and the future (backwards causation, or retrocausality).

Similarly as the de Broglie–Bohm theory, TSVF yields the same predictions as standard quantum mechanics. Lev Vaidman emphasizes that TSVF fits very well with Hugh Everett's many-worlds interpretation, with the difference that initial and final conditions single out one branch of wavefunctions (our world).

The two-state vector formalism has similarities with the transactional interpretation of quantum mechanics proposed by John G. Cramer in 1986, although Ruth Kastner has argued that the two interpretations (Transactional and Two-State Vector) have important differences as well. It shares the property of time symmetry with the Wheeler–Feynman absorber theory by Richard Feynman and John Archibald Wheeler and with the time-symmetric theories of Kenneth B. Wharton and Michael B. Heaney

== See also ==
- Satosi Watanabe
- Yakir Aharonov
- Weak measurement
- Delayed choice experiment
- Wheeler–Feynman absorber theory
- Positive operator valued measure
