= Afshar experiment =

2004 quantum mechanics experiment

The Afshar experiment is a variation of the double-slit experiment in quantum mechanics, devised and carried out by Shahriar Afshar in 2004. In the experiment, light generated by a laser passes through two closely spaced pinholes, and is refocused by a lens so that the image of each pinhole falls on a separate single-photon detector. In addition, a grid of thin wires is placed just before the lens on the dark fringes of an interference pattern.

Afshar claimed that the experiment gives information about which path a photon takes through the apparatus, while simultaneously allowing interference between the paths to be observed. According to Afshar, this violates the complementarity principle of quantum mechanics.

The experiment has been analyzed and repeated by a number of investigators. There are several theories that explain the effect without violating complementarity. John G. Cramer claims the experiment provides evidence for the transactional interpretation of quantum mechanics over other interpretations.

== History ==
Shahriar Afshar's experimental work was done initially at the Institute for Radiation-Induced Mass Studies (IRIMS) in Boston and later reproduced at Harvard University, while he was there as a visiting researcher. The results were first presented at a seminar at Harvard in March 2004. The experiment was featured as the cover story in the July 24, 2004 edition of the popular science magazine New Scientist endorsed by professor John G. Cramer of the University of Washington. The New Scientist feature article generated many responses, including various letters to the editor that appeared in the August 7 and August 14, 2004, issues, arguing against the conclusions being drawn by Afshar. The results were published in a SPIE conference proceedings in 2005. A follow-up paper was published in a scientific journal Foundations of Physics in January 2007 and featured in New Scientist in February 2007.

== Experimental setup ==
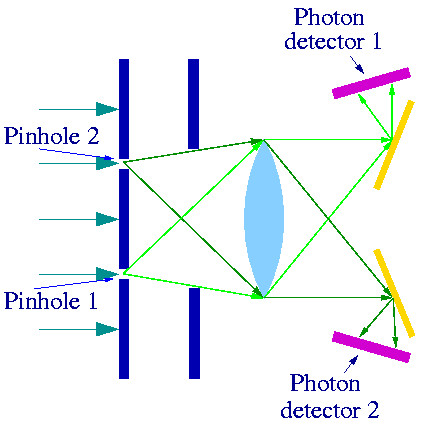
Fig.1 Experiment without obstructing wire grid

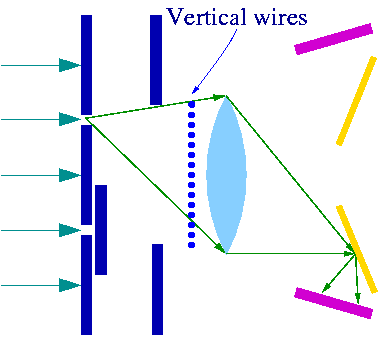
Fig.2 Experiment with obstructing wire grid and one pinhole covered

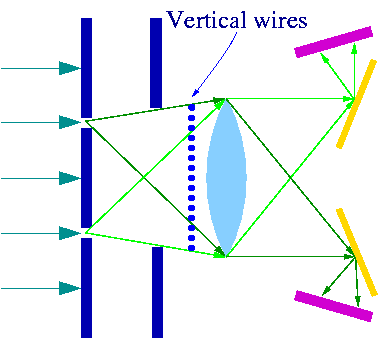
Fig.3 Experiment with wire grid and both pinholes open. The wires lie in the dark fringes and thus block very little light

The experiment uses a setup similar to that for the double-slit experiment. In Afshar's variant, light generated by a laser passes through two closely spaced circular pinholes (not slits). After the dual pinholes, a lens refocuses the light so that the image of each pinhole falls on separate photon-detectors (Fig. 1). With pinhole 2 closed, a photon that goes through pinhole 1 impinges only on photon detector 1. Similarly, with pinhole 1 closed, a photon that goes through pinhole 2 impinges only on photon detector 2. With both pinholes open, Afshar claims, citing Wheeler in support, that pinhole 1 remains correlated to photon Detector 1 (and vice versa for pinhole 2 to photon Detector 2), and therefore that which-way information is preserved when both pinholes are open.

When the light acts as a wave, because of quantum interference one can observe that there are regions that the photons avoid, called dark fringes. A grid of thin wires is placed just before the lens (Fig. 2) so that the wires lie in the dark fringes of an interference pattern which is produced by the dual pinhole setup. If one of the pinholes is blocked, the interference pattern will no longer be formed, and the grid of wires causes appreciable diffraction in the light and blocks some of it from detection by the corresponding photon detector. However, when both pinholes are open, the effect of the wires is negligible, comparable to the case in which there are no wires placed in front of the lens (Fig. 3), because the wires lie in the dark fringes of an interference pattern. The effect is not dependent on the light intensity (photon flux).

== Afshar's interpretation ==
Afshar's conclusion is that, when both pinholes are open, the light exhibits wave-like behavior when going past the wires, since the light goes through the spaces between the wires but avoids the wires themselves, but also exhibits particle-like behavior after going through the lens, with photons going to a correlated photo-detector. Afshar argues that this behavior contradicts the principle of complementarity to the extent that it shows both wave and particle characteristics in the same experiment for the same photons.

Afshar asserts that there is simultaneously high visibility V of interference as well as high distinguishability D (corresponding to which-path information), so that V^{2} + D^{2} > 1, and the wave-particle duality relation is violated.

== Reception ==
=== Specific criticism ===
A number of scientists have published criticisms of Afshar's interpretation of his results, some of which reject the claims of a violation of complementarity, while differing in the way they explain how complementarity copes with the experiment. For example, one paper contests Afshar's core claim, that the Englert–Greenberger duality relation is violated. The researchers re-ran the experiment, using a different method for measuring the visibility of the interference pattern than that used by Afshar, and found no violation of complementarity, concluding "This result demonstrates that the experiment can be perfectly explained by the Copenhagen interpretation of quantum mechanics."

Below is a synopsis of papers by several critics highlighting their main arguments and the disagreements they have amongst themselves:

- Ruth Kastner, Committee on the History and Philosophy of Science, University of Maryland, College Park.
  Kastner's criticism, published in a peer-reviewed paper, proceeds by setting up a thought experiment and applying Afshar's logic to it to expose its flaw. She proposes that Afshar's experiment is equivalent to preparing an electron in a spin-up state and then measuring its sideways spin. This does not imply that one has found out the up-down spin state and the sideways spin state of any electron simultaneously. Applied to Afshar's experiment: "Nevertheless, even with the grid removed, since the photon is prepared in a superposition S, the measurement at the final screen at t_{2} never really is a 'which-way' measurement (the term traditionally attached to the slit-basis observable $\mathcal O$), because it cannot tell us 'which slit the photon actually went through.'
- Daniel Reitzner, Research Center for Quantum Information, Institute of Physics, Slovak Academy of Sciences, Bratislava, Slovakia.
  Reitzner performed numerical simulations, published in a preprint, of Afshar's arrangement and obtained the same results that Afshar obtained experimentally. From this he argues that the photons exhibit wave behavior, including high fringe visibility but no which-way information, up to the point they hit the detector: "In other words the two-peaked distribution is an interference pattern and the photon behaves as a wave and exhibits no particle properties until it hits the plate. As a result a which-way information can never be obtained in this way."
- W. G. Unruh, Professor of Physics at University of British Columbia
  Unruh, like Kastner, proceeds by setting up an arrangement that he feels is equivalent but simpler. The size of the effect is larger so that it is easier to see the flaw in the logic. In Unruh's view that flaw is, in the case that an obstacle exists at the position of the dark fringes, "drawing the inference that IF the particle was detected in detector 1, THEN it must have come from path 1. Similarly, IF it were detected in detector 2, then it came from path 2." In other words, he accepts the existence of an interference pattern but rejects the existence of which-way information.
- Luboš Motl, Former assistant professor of physics, Harvard University.
  Motl's criticism, published in his blog, is based on an analysis of Afshar's actual setup, instead of proposing a different experiment like Unruh and Kastner. In contrast to Unruh and Kastner, he believes that which-way information always exists, but argues that the measured contrast of the interference pattern is actually very low: "Because this signal (disruption) from the second, middle picture is small (equivalently, it only affects a very small portion of the photons), the contrast V is also very small, and goes to zero for infinitely thin wires." He also argues that the experiment can be understood with classical electrodynamics and has "nothing to do with quantum mechanics".
- Ole Steuernagel, School of Physics, Astronomy and Mathematics, University of Hertfordshire, UK.
  Steuernagel makes a quantitative analysis of the various transmitted, refracted, and reflected modes in a setup that differs only slightly from Afshar's. He concludes that the Englert-Greenberger duality relation is strictly satisfied, and in particular that the fringe visibility for thin wires is small. Like some of the other critics, he emphasizes that inferring an interference pattern is not the same as measuring one: "Finally, the greatest weakness in the analysis given by Afshar is the inference that an interference pattern must be present."
- Andrew Knight, Department of Physics, New York University
  Argues that Afshar's claim to violate complementarity is a simple logical inconsistency: by setting up the experiment so that photons are spatially coherent over the two pinholes, the pinholes are necessarily indistinguishable by those photons. "In other words, Afshar et al. claim in one breath to have set up the experiment so that pinholes A and B are inherently indistinguishable by certain photons [specifically, photons that are produced to be spatially coherent over the width spanned by pinholes that are thus incapable of distinguishing them], and in another breath to have distinguished pinholes A and B with those same photons."

=== Specific support ===
- Afshar's coauthors Eduardo Flores and Ernst Knoesel criticize Kastner's setup and propose an alternative experimental setup. By removing the lens of Afshar and causing two beams to overlap at a small angle, Flores et al. aimed to show that conservation of momentum guarantee the preservation of which-path information when both pinholes are open. But this experiment is still subject to Motl's objection that the 2 beams have a sub-microscopic diffraction pattern created by the convergence of the beams before the slits; the result would have been the measuring of which slit was open before the wires were ever reached.
- John G. Cramer adopts Afshar's interpretation of the experiment to support his own transactional interpretation of quantum mechanics over the Copenhagen interpretation and the many-worlds interpretation.

== See also ==
- Wheeler's delayed choice experiment
- Delayed choice quantum eraser
- Weak measurement
- Wheeler–Feynman absorber theory
