= Quantum Cheshire cat =

Phenomena in quantum physics

In quantum mechanics, the quantum Cheshire cat is a quantum phenomenon that suggests that a particle's physical properties can take a different trajectory from that of the particle itself. The name makes reference to the Cheshire Cat from Lewis Carroll's Alice's Adventures in Wonderland, a feline character which could disappear leaving only its grin behind. The effect was originally proposed by Yakir Aharonov, Daniel Rohrlich, Sandu Popescu and Paul Skrzypczyk in 2012.

In classical physics, physical properties cannot be detached from the object associated to it. If a magnet follows a given trajectory in space and time, its magnetic moment follows it through the same trajectory. However, in quantum mechanics, particles can be in a quantum superposition of more than one trajectory previous to measurement. The quantum Cheshire experiments suggests that previous to a measurement, a particle may take two paths, but the property of the particle, like the spin of a massive particle or the polarization of a light beam, travels only through one of the paths, while the particle takes the opposite path. The conclusion is only obtained from an analysis of weak measurements, which consist in interpreting the particle history previous to measurement by studying quantum systems in the presence of small disturbances.

Experimental demonstration of the quantum Cheshire cat have already been claimed in different systems, including photons and neutrons. The effect has been suggested as a probe to study properties of massive particles by detaching it from its magnetic moment in order to shield them from electromagnetic disturbances. A dynamical quantum Cheshire cat has also been proposed as a counterfactual quantum communication protocol.

== Example of the experiment ==
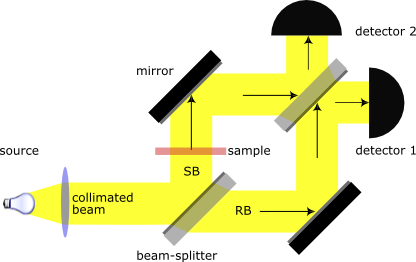
Mach-Zehnder interferometer. In this example, the beam is replaced by neutrons with a magnetic moment pointing to the right. Detector 1 only detects neutrons with the original magnetic moment orientation. Detector 2 is dark and is not relevant. SB is a filter.

Neutrons are uncharged subatomic particles that have a magnetic moment, with two possible projections on any given axis.

A beam of neutrons, with all with their magnetic moments aligned to the right, enters a Mach–Zehnder interferometer coming from the left-to-right. The neutrons can exit the interferometer into a right port, where a detector of neutrons with right magnetic moment is located, or upwards into a dark port with no detector (see picture).

The neutrons enter the interferometer and reach a beam splitter. Each neutron that passes through, enters into a quantum superposition state of two different paths, namely A and B. This initial state is referred to as the preselected state. As the neutrons travel the different paths, their wave functions reunites at a second beam splitter, causing interference. If there is nothing in the path of the neutrons, every neutron exits to the interferometer moving to the right and activates the detector. No neutron escapes upwards into the dark port due to destructive interference.

One can add different components and filters in one of the paths. By adding a filter that flips the magnetic moment of the neutron in path B (lower branch), it leads to a new superposition state: neutron taking path A with a magnetic moment pointing right, plus the neutron taking path B with the magnetic moment flipped pointing to the left. This state is called a postselected state. As the states can no longer interfere coherently due to this modification, the neutrons can exit through the two ports, either to the right reaching the detector or exiting towards the dark port.

In this configuration, if the detector clicks, it is only because the neutrons had a magnetic moment oriented in to the right. By means of this postselection, it can be confidently stated that the neutron that reached the detector passed through path A, which is the only path to contains neutron magnetic moments oriented to the right. This effect can be easily demonstrated by putting a thin absorber of neutrons in the path. By placing the absorber in path B, the rate of neutrons that are detected remains constant. However, when the absorber is positioned in path A, the detection rate decreases, providing evidence that detected neutrons in the postselected state travel only through path A.

If a magnetic field is applied perpendicular to the plane of the interferometer and localized in either path A or path B, the number of neutrons that are detected changes, as the magnetic fields makes the neutrons precess and alters the probabilities of being measured. Additionally, measuring the magnetism and the trajectory (with an absorber) at the same time is not possible without also disrupting the quantum state.

The quantum Cheshire cat appears in the weak limit of the interaction. When a sufficiently small magnetic field is applied to path A, there is no impact on the measurement. In contrast, if the magnetic field is applied to path B, the detection rate diminishes, demonstrating that the neutrons magnetism, perpendicular to the plane of the interferometer, predominantly resided in path B. We can do the same with a thin absorber, showing that only the neutrons that are detected are all from path A. This experiment effectively separated the "cat", representing the neutron, from its "grin", symbolizing its magnetic moment out of the plane.

== General description ==
Consider a particle with a two-level property that can be either $|0\rangle$ or $|1\rangle$, this can be for example the horizontal and vertical polarization of a photon or the spin projection of a spin-1/2 particle as in the previous example with the neutrons. One of these two polarization states (let's say $|0\rangle$) is chosen and the particle is then prepared to be in the following superposition:

$$|\Psi\rangle=\frac{(|A\rangle+|B \rangle)}{\sqrt 2 }|0\rangle,$$

where $|A\rangle$ and $|B\rangle$ are two possible orthogonal trajectories of the particle. The state $|\Psi\rangle$ is called the preselected state.

A filter is added in path $|B\rangle$ of the particle in order to flip its polarization from $|0\rangle$ to $|1\rangle$, such that it ends up in the state

$$|\Phi\rangle=\frac{|A\rangle|0\rangle+|B \rangle|1\rangle}{\sqrt 2},$$

such state indicates that if the particle is measured to be in state $|0\rangle$, the particle took path $|A\rangle$; analogously, if the particle is measured to be in state $|1\rangle$, the particle took path $|B\rangle$. The state $|\Phi\rangle$ is called the postselected state.

Using postselection techniques, the particle is measured in order to detect the overlap between the preselected state and postselected state. If there are no disturbances, the preselected and postselected states produce the same results 1/4 of time.

=== Weak measurements ===
We define the weak value of an operator $O$ given by

$$\langle O \rangle_{\rm w} =\frac{\langle \phi|O| \psi\rangle}{\langle \phi |\psi\rangle},$$

where $|\psi\rangle$ is the preselected state and $|\phi\rangle$ the postselected state. This calculation can be thought as the contribution of a given interaction up to linear order.

For the system, one considers two projectors operators given by

$$\Pi_A = |A\rangle\langle A|,$$

and

$$\Pi_B = |B\rangle\langle B|,$$

which measure if the particle is on either path $|A\rangle$ or $|B\rangle$, respectively.

Additionally, an out-of the-plane polarization operator is defined as

$$\sigma_\perp = |0\rangle\langle 1|+|1\rangle\langle0|,$$

this operator can be thought as a measure of angular momentum in the system. Outside the weak limit, the interaction related to this operator tends to make the polarization precess between $|0\rangle$ and $|1\rangle$.

Performing the following weak measurements on the positions with $|\phi\rangle=|\Phi\rangle$ and $|\psi\rangle=|\Psi\rangle$, one obtains the following

$$\langle \Pi_A \rangle_{\rm w} =1$$,
$$\langle \Pi_B \rangle_{\rm w} = 0.$$

These weak values indicate that if the path $|A\rangle$ is slightly perturbed, then the measurement is perturbed. While if instead path $|B\rangle$ is perturbed this does not affect the measurement.

We also consider weak measurements on the out-of the-plane polarization in each of the paths, such that

$$\langle \Pi_A\sigma_\perp \rangle_{\rm w} =0,$$
$$\langle \Pi_B\sigma_\perp \rangle_{\rm w} =1.$$

These values indicate that if the polarization is slightly modified in path $|B\rangle$, then the results are slightly modified too. However, if the polarization is perturbed in path $|A\rangle$ there is no correction to the intensity measured (in the weak limit).

These 4 weak values lead to the quantum Cheshire cat conclusion.

== Interpretations and criticism ==
The proposal of quantum Cheshire cat has received some criticism. Popescu, one of the authors of the original paper, acknowledged it was not well received by all of the referees who first reviewed the original work.

As the quantum Cheshire cat effect is subjected to analysis of the trajectory before measurement, its conclusion depends on the interpretation of quantum mechanics, which is still an open problem in physics. Some authors reach different conclusions for this effect or disregard the effect completely. It has been suggested that the quantum Cheshire cat is just an apparent paradox raising from misinterpreting wave interference. Other authors consider that it can be reproduced classically.

The experimental results depend on the postselection and analysis of the data. It has been suggested that the weak value cannot be interpreted as a real property of the system, but as an optimal estimate of the corresponding observable, given that the postselection is successful. Aephraim M. Steinberg, notes that the experiment with neutrons does not prove that any single neutron took a different path than its magnetic moments; but shows only that the measured neutrons behaved this way on average. It has also been argued that even if the weak values were measured in the neutron Cheshire cat experiment, they do not imply that a particle and one of its properties have been disembodied due to unavoidable quadratic interactions in the experiment. This last point was acknowledged by A. Matzkin, one of the coauthors of the neutron experiment paper.
