= Einstein's Bridge =

Einstein's Bridge may refer to:

- Einstein's Bridge (novel), a novel by John Cramer
- Einstein–Rosen bridge, a particular property of a black hole
