= Nirmalya Ghosh =

Indian Physicist

- Born: 1 May 1974 (age 52); Kolkata, West Bengal, India
- Citizenship: Indian
- Education: University of Kalyani; IIT Kanpur; University of Toronto
- Known for: Contributions in the field of Optical Polarization and related phenomena
- Awards: 2021 SPIE G.G. Stokes Award in Optical Polarization; Fellowship of Indian Academy of Sciences (FASc); Fellowship of National Academy of Sciences India (FNASc)
- Scientific career
- Fields: Physics; Polarization Optics; Weak measurements; Spin-orbit Photonics
- Workplaces: RRCAT; IISER Kolkata

Nirmalya Ghosh (born 1974) is an Indian physicist known for his research in the field of Optical Polarization and related phenomena. He is a professor in the Department of Physical Sciences and Centre of Excellence in Space sciences India (CESSI), Indian Institute of Science Education and Research (IISER) Kolkata.

== Awards and recognition ==
Ghosh was awarded the G.G Stokes Award in optical polarization by SPIE (2021), the international society of optics and photonics. This award is presented for exceptional contribution to the field of optical polarization and related phenomena. In recognition of his overall contributions in the domain of physics, he was elected Fellow of Indian Academy of Sciences (FASc) in 2022 and Fellow of National Academy of Sciences, India (FNASc) in 2022.

== Selected publications ==
- Nayak, Jeeban Kumar; Suchiang, Harley; Ray, Subir Kumar; Guchhait, Shyamal; Banerjee, Ayan; Gupta, Subhasish Dutta; Gupta, Subhasish Dutta; Ghosh, Nirmalya (2023). "Spin-Direction-Spin Coupling of Quasiguided Modes in Plasmonic Crystals". Physical Review Letters. 131 (19) 193803. Bibcode:2023PhRvL.131s3803N. doi:10.1103/PhysRevLett.131.193803. PMID 38000433.
- Bhunia, Surojit; Chandel, Shubham; Karan, Sumanta Kumar; Dey, Somnath; Tiwari, Akash; Das, Sushovan; Kumar, Nishkarsh; Chowdhury, Rituparno; Mandal, Saikat; Ghosh, Ishita; Mandal, Amit; Khatua, Bhanu Bhushan; Ghosh, Nirmalya; Malla Reddy, C. (2021). "Autonomous self-repair in piezoelectric molecular crystals". Science. 373 (6552): 321–327. Bibcode:2021Sci...373..321B. doi:10.1126/science.abg3886. PMID 34437150.
- Pal, Mandira; Saha, Sudipta; B.S., Athira; Dutta Gupta, Subhasish; Ghosh, Nirmalya (2019). "Experimental probe of weak value amplification and geometric phase through the complex zeros of the response function". Physical Review A. 99 (3) 032123. arXiv:1807.04103. Bibcode:2019PhRvA..99c2123P. doi:10.1103/PhysRevA.99.032123.

== See also ==
- Polarization (waves)
- Mueller calculus
- Spin angular momentum of light
