= Transactional model =

Transactional model, generally speaking, refers to a model in which interactions in two directions are considered together, for example from one person to another and back, or from one subsystem to another and back. Specifically, the term "transactional model" may refer,

in biology and psychology, to the:

- Transactional model of stress and coping

in communication theory and psychology of communication, to a:

- Transactional model of communication

in physics, to the:

- Transactional interpretation of quantum mechanics
