= Weak value =

Quantity in quantum mechanics

In quantum mechanics (and computation), a weak value is a quantity related to a shift of a measuring device's pointer when usually there is pre- and postselection. It should not be confused with a weak measurement, which is often defined in conjunction. The weak value was first defined by Yakir Aharonov, David Albert, and Lev Vaidman in 1988, published in Physical Review Letters and is related to the two-state vector formalism. The first experimental realization came from researchers at Rice University in 1991. The physical interpretation and significance of weak values remains a subject of ongoing discussion in the quantum foundations and metrology literature.

== Definition ==
The weak value of the observable $A$ is defined as:
$$A_w = \frac{\langle\psi_f|A|\psi_i\rangle}{\langle\psi_f|\psi_i\rangle},$$
where $|\psi_i\rangle$ is the initial or preselection state and $|\psi_f\rangle$ is the final or postselection state. The nth order weak value, $A^n_w$ is defined using the nth power of the operator in this expression.

Weak values arise in small perturbations of quantum measurements. Representing a small perturbation with the operator $\exp(-i\epsilon \hat{A})$, the probability of detecting a system in a final state given the initial state is
$$P_\epsilon = |{\langle\psi_f|\exp(-i\epsilon \hat{A})|\psi_i\rangle}|^2,$$
For small perturbations, $\epsilon$ is small and the exponential can be expanded in a Taylor series
$$P_\epsilon = |{\langle\psi_f|1-i\epsilon \hat{A} +\dots|\psi_i\rangle}|^2,$$
The first term is the unperturbed probability of detection, $P =|{\langle\psi_f|\psi_i\rangle}|^2$, and the first order correction involves the first order weak value:
$$\frac{P_\epsilon}{P} \approx 1 + 2 \epsilon A_w.$$
In general the weak value quantity is a complex number. In the weak interaction regime, the ratio $P_\epsilon/P$ is close to one and $\epsilon Im A_w$ is significantly larger than higher order terms.

For example, two Stern-Gerlach analyzers can be arranged along the y axis, with the field of the first one along the z axis set at low magnetic field and second on along the x axis with sufficient field to separate the spin 1/2 particle beams. Going into the second analyzer is the initial state
$$|\psi_i\rangle= \frac{1}{\sqrt{2}}\begin{pmatrix}\cos\frac{\alpha}{2}+\sin\frac{\alpha}{2} \\ \cos\frac{\alpha}{2}-\sin\frac{\alpha}{2}\end{pmatrix}$$
and the final state will be
$$|\psi_f\rangle=\frac{1}{\sqrt{2}}\begin{pmatrix}1 \\ 1 \end{pmatrix}.$$
The perturbing action of the first analyzer is described with Pauli z-axis operator as $A= \sigma_z$ giving the weak value
$$A_w = (\sigma_z)_w = \tan\frac{\alpha}{2}.$$

== Real part ==
The real part of the weak value provides a quantitative way to discuss non-classical aspects of quantum systems. When the real part of a weak value is falls outside the range of the eigenvalues of the operator, it is called an "anomalous weak value". In addition to being important in discussions of quantum paradoxes, anomalous weak values are the basis of quantum sensor applications.

== Derivation ==
The derivation below follows the presentation given References.

Derivation (click to show)

A quantum system is measured by coupling it to an ancillary quantum system that acts as the measuring device. The joint Hilbert space is $H_{\rm system} \otimes H_{\rm ancilla}$. The observable to be measured on the system is $A$. The system and ancilla interact through the Hamiltonian
$$H = \gamma A \otimes p,$$
where the coupling constant is integrated over an interaction time $\gamma = \int_{t_i}^{t_f} g(t) dt \ll 1$ and $[q, p] =i$ is the canonical commutator. The Hamiltonian generates the unitary
$$U= \exp[-i \gamma A\otimes p].$$

Let the initial state of the ancilla be a Gaussian wavepacket in position space,
$$|\Phi\rangle = \frac{1}{(2\pi \sigma^2)^{1/4}}\int dq' \exp[-q'^2/4\sigma^2]|q'\rangle.$$
Its position wavefunction is
$$\Phi(q) =\langle q|\Phi\rangle = \frac{1}{(2\pi \sigma^2)^{1/4}} \exp[-q^2/4\sigma^2],$$
where $\sigma$ characterizes the initial uncertainty in the pointer position of the measuring device and $|q\rangle$ denotes an eigenstate of the position operator $q$.

The system begins in the state $|\psi_i\rangle$. Thus, the combined initial state of the system and ancilla is $|\Psi\rangle$, jointly describing the initial state of the system and ancilla, is given then by:
$$|\Psi\rangle =|\psi_i\rangle \otimes |\Phi\rangle.$$

Next the system and ancilla interact via the unitary $U |\Psi\rangle$. After this one performs a projective measurement of the projectors $\{ |\psi_f\rangle\langle \psi_f |, I- |\psi_f\rangle\langle \psi_f |\}$ on the system. Postselecting (or condition) on getting the outcome $|\psi_f\rangle\langle \psi_f |$, then the (unnormalized) final state of the meter is

$$\begin{align}
|\Phi_f \rangle
&= \langle \psi_f |U |\psi_i\rangle \otimes |\Phi\rangle\\
&\approx \langle \psi_f |(I\otimes I -i \gamma A\otimes p ) |\psi_i\rangle \otimes|\Phi\rangle \quad \text{(I)}\\
&= \langle \psi_f|\psi_i\rangle (1 -i \gamma A_w p ) |\Phi\rangle\\
&\approx \langle \psi_f|\psi_i\rangle \exp(-i \gamma A_w p) |\Phi\rangle. \quad \text{(II)}
\end{align}$$
Here it looks like the ancilla state will be shifted by $\gamma A_w$ due to the momentum operator in the exponential. There is a way to obtain weak values without postselection..

To arrive at this conclusion, the first order series expansion of $U$ on line (I) is used, and one requires that

$$\begin{align}
\frac{|\gamma|}{\sigma} \left|\frac{\langle \psi_f |A^n |\psi_i \rangle}{ \langle \psi_f| A |\psi_i \rangle }\right|^{1/(n-1)} \ll 1, \quad (n = 2, 3, \dots)
\end{align}$$

On line (II) the approximation that $e^{-x}\approx 1-x$ for small $x$ was used. This final approximation is only valid when
$$|\gamma A_w|/\sigma \ll 1.$$

As $p$ is the generator of translations, the ancilla's wavefunction is now given by
$$\Phi_f(q) = \Phi(q-\gamma A_w).$$

This is the original wavefunction, shifted by an amount $\gamma A_w$. By Busch's theorem the system and meter wavefunctions are necessarily disturbed by the measurement. Although the protocol used to access the weak value is minimally disturbing in a specific sense, it still induces disturbance.

== Applications ==
Weak values have been proposed as potentially useful for quantum metrology and for clarifying aspects of quantum foundations. The sections below briefly outline these applications.

=== Quantum metrology ===
At the end of the original weak value paper the authors suggested weak values could be used in quantum metrology:

Another striking aspect of this experiment becomes evident when we consider it as a device for measuring a small gradient of the magnetic field ... yields a tremendous amplification.

— Aharonov, Albert, Vaidman

In modern language, when the weak value $A_w$ lies outside the eigenvalue range of the observable $A$, the effect is known as weak value amplification. In this regime, the shift of the measuring device's pointer can appear much larger than expected, for example a component of spin may seem 100 times greater than its largest eigenvalue. This amplification effect has been viewed as potentially beneficial for metrological applications where small physical signals need to be detected with high sensitivity.

This weak value amplification subsequently demonstrated experimentally..

=== Quantum Tomography ===
Weak values have also been explored in the context of quantum state tomography. Direct state tomography uses weak measurements and post-selection, motivated by weak-value protocols, to reconstruct the quantum state. It also provides an operational interpretation of wavefunction amplitudes. Weak-measurement tomography aims to improve upon standard tomography by exploiting the minimal disturbance from weak measurements, allowing the same system to be reused for additional measurements.

=== Quantum foundations ===
Weak values are used as indicators of nonclassicality, as tools for explaining quantum paradoxes, and as links between different interpretations of quantum mechanics.

Anomalous weak values, those lying outside the eigenvalue range of an observable, are considered indicators of nonclassicality. They serve as proofs of quantum contextuality, showing that measurement outcomes cannot be reproduced by any noncontextual hidden-variable model..

Weak values have been used to create and explain some of the paradoxes in the foundations of quantum theory, for example, the Quantum Cheshire cat. They have also been used in experimental studies of Hardy's paradox, where joint weak measurements of entangled pairs of photons reproduced the paradoxical predictions.

Weak values have been proposed as a way to define a particle's velocity at a given position, referred to as the 'naively observable velocity.' Experiments in 2010 reported photon trajectories in a double-slit interferometer that qualitatively matched earlier predictions for photons in the de Broglie-Bohm interpretation. Subsequent analyses have argued that weak velocity measurements do not provide new evidence for or against de Broglie-Bohm theory and cannot directly reveal the form of particle trajectories, even under deterministic assumptions

== Criticisms ==
Criticisms of weak values include philosophical and practical criticisms. Some noted researchers such as Asher Peres, Tony Leggett, David Mermin, and Charles H. Bennett are critical of weak values.

After Aharonov, Albert, and Vaidman published their paper, two critical comments and a reply were subsequently published.

Asher Peres in his comment, argued that even if a weak measurement yields a precisely determined average value, this does not imply the observable itself actually took that value. He stated that a detailed analysis of the measurement data would reveal two peaks at ($p = \pm 1$), corresponding to the true eigenvalues, with their widths reflecting the initial measurement uncertainty. According to Peres, such results are fully consistent with standard quantum mechanics, and the apparently "anomalous" weak values arise from overlap and interference effects rather than any violation of quantum principles.
Tony Leggett's comment raised two main objections. First, he argued that Aharonov, Albert, and Vaidman's result is largely irrelevant to standard quantum measurement theory because it relies on a nonstandard definition of measurement, treating a specific weak interaction Hamiltonian as fundamental rather than as one component of a broader process. Second, he maintained that the weak value $A_w$ is not a true value of the observable—it is neither an individual outcome nor an ensemble average, but instead reflects how the system affects the measuring device under weak coupling and postselection, and is valid only to lowest order in the interaction strength.

The reply by Aharonov and Vaidman to the comments by Peres and Leggett addressed several of the technical points raised in the critiques, although later discussions in the literature have expressed differing views on how fully these issues were resolved.

=== Metrological Significance ===
There has been extensive debate in the primary literature regarding the role of weak values in quantum metrology, including critiques and rebuttals. According to a review article, analyses based on Fisher information and parameter estimation indicate that postselected weak-value amplification does not generally improve precision in metrological tasks. Although the technique can increase signal size, postselection reduces data efficiency because most trials are discarded. The review concludes that weak-value methods do not provide a fundamental quantum advantage in metrology, and that large amplification factors alone do not enhance estimation performance.
