= Satoshi Watanabe =

Satoshi Watanabe may refer to:

- Satosi Watanabe, theoretical physicist
- Satoshi Watanabe (beach volleyball) (born 1975), Japanese beach volleyball player
