= Paul Kwiat =

American physicist

Paul Gregory Kwiat is an American physicist.

Kwiat earned a doctorate at the University of California, Berkeley in 1993, where he was advised by Raymond Chiao and authored the dissertation Nonclassical effects from spontaneous parametric down-conversion: Adventures in quantum wonderland. Kwiat worked as a postdoc with Anton Zeilinger at the University of Innsbruck for two years, then at the Los Alamos National Laboratory until 2001, when he began teaching at the University of Illinois Urbana–Champaign as the John Bardeen Chair in Electrical Engineering and Physics. The American Physical Society elevated Kwiat to fellowship status in 2001, "[f]or the development of quantum optical techniques to investigate the foundations of quantum physics and their use in studies of quantum information concepts". Kwiat was awarded Optica's R. W. Wood Prize in 2009, and is also an Optica fellow.
