= Sandu Popescu =

British physicist

Sandu Popescu FRS
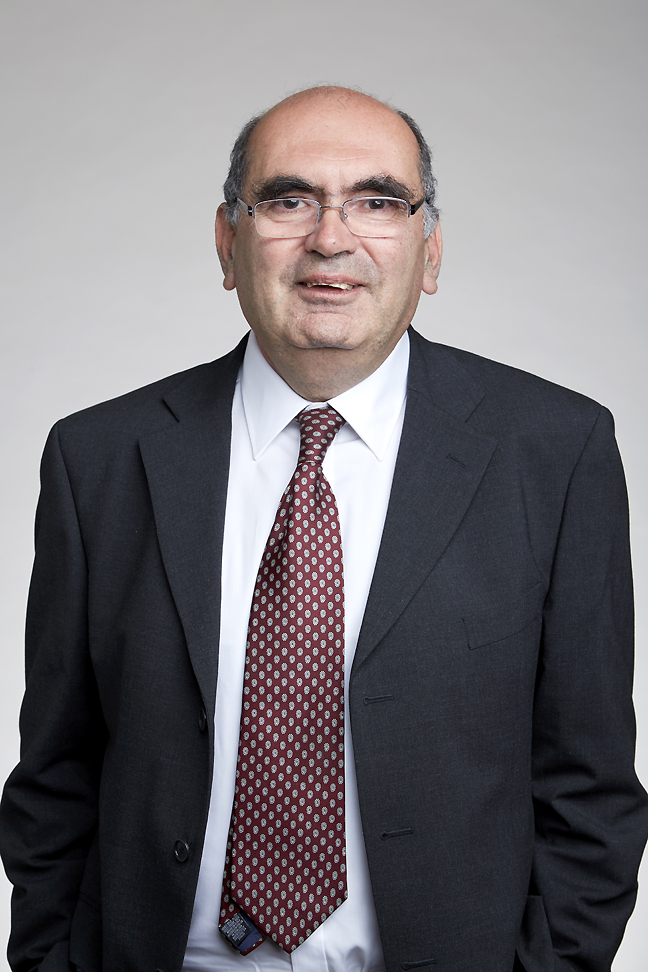
- Popescu at the Royal Society admissions day in London, July 2017
- Born: 1956 (age 69–70); Oradea, Romania
- Known for: Entanglement distillation; Quantum teleportation; Quantum nonlocality; Superquantum nonlocality; Quantum Cheshire cat
- Awards: Adams Prize (2001); Clifford Paterson Lecture (2004); John Stewart Bell Prize (2011); Wolfson Research Merit Award (2012); IOP Dirac Medal (2016); Cozzarelli Prize (2016); Fellow of the Royal Society (2017)
- Scientific career
- Fields: Physics
- Workplaces: University of Bristol
- Doctoral advisor: Yakir Aharonov
- Website: sandupopescu.com

Sandu Popescu FRS (born 1956 in Oradea, Romania) is a Romanian-British physicist working in the foundations of quantum mechanics and quantum information.

== Education and career ==
He studied with Yakir Aharonov, followed by postdoctoral research positions with François Englert, and then with Abner Shimony and Bahaa Saleh. From 1996 to 1999 he was Reader at the Isaac Newton Institute, University of Cambridge.

Popescu has been Professor of Physics at the University of Bristol since 1999.

Popescu is co-editor and co-author of the first textbook on quantum information and computation.

In 2015, Popescu appeared on Science Channel's Through the Wormhole with Morgan Freeman.

== Research ==
His most important contributions are in the area of quantum nonlocality. In collaboration with Daniel Rohrlich, simultaneously and independently from Nicolas Gisin, Popescu showed that non-locality is a generic property of nature: every entangled pure quantum state (i. e. almost every pure state) has nonlocal properties. In collaboration with Charles Bennett, Herbert Bernstein, and Benjamin Schumacher, he established the quantitative theory of entanglement by the discovery of entanglement concentration and dilution, and together with Bennett, Schumacher, Gilles Brassard, John Smolin, and William Wootters a method of entanglement purification (distillation). These works introduced the idea of entanglement manipulation by local operations and classical communication (LOCC), and introduced the notions of entanglement of distillation and entanglement of formation. He also proved that there is a unique measure of entanglement for pure bi-partite quantum states (the von Neumann entropy of the reduced density matrix).

With Daniel Rohrlich, Popescu showed that nonlocal correlations stronger than those allowed by quantum mechanics could exist without violating Einstein's principle of no superluminal signalling. These correlations are now known as Popescu-Rohrlich correlations (PR boxes). This work started the intensive research program taking place at the moment to find new principles of nature that would limit nonlocality to only quantum correlations, and in this way recover quantum mechanics from general principles.

In 1997, he was one of the first researchers to implement quantum teleportation, one of the landmark experiments in quantum information.

Another of Popescu's interests is the foundations of statistical mechanics. In collaboration with Noah Linden, Anthony J. Short and Andreas Winter he proved that virtually any quantum system interacting with a larger system (the "bath") reaches equilibrium. Crucially, this is the first demonstration of equilibration – the most important aspect of statistical mechanics – directly from first principles, without any additional assumptions. The result holds even in situations in which the standard assumptions of statistical mechanics do not apply, such as systems with strong long-range, non-screened interactions where temperature cannot even be defined. In an earlier work with Short and Winter he showed that the so-called equal a priori probability postulate, one of the basic postulates of statistical mechanics, is redundant, and is simply a consequence of typicality. (A similar proof is due to Goldstein et al.)

With Yakir Aharonov and his group, Popescu discovered a number of quantum paradoxes, such as the quantum Cheshire cat, and the quantum pigeonhole principle. They also introduced the idea of superposition of time evolutions.

Together with Serge Massar, Popescu pioneered the study of optimal measurements and proved that in general they require collective (i.e. entangled) measurements on all of the particles in a finite statistical ensemble. Among the counter-intuitive consequences of quantum theory is his discovery with Nicolas Gisin that two antiparallel spins contain more information about their direction than parallel spins.

More recently Popescu's interest is in the thermodynamics of quantum systems. In collaboration with Noah Linden and Paul Skrzypczyk, he described the smallest possible refrigerator, and together with Skrzypczyk and Anthony J. Short, extended the laws of thermodynamics to individual quantum systems.

== Awards and honours ==
Popescu has won numerous awards and honours including:

- 2021 European Research Council (ERC) Advanced Grant on Fundamental Limits of Quantum Mechanics and Physical Laws in a Non-deterministic World
- 2017 Elected Fellow of the Royal Society
- 2016 Dirac Medal from the Institute of Physics
- 2016 Cozzarelli Prize
- 2012 Wolfson Research Merit Award – awarded by the Royal Society
- 2012–2015 Templeton Frontiers Distinguished Visiting Research Chair – Perimeter Institute
- 2011 John Stewart Bell Prize
- 2011 European Research Council (ERC) Advanced Grant on Nonlocality in Space and Time
- 2004 Clifford Paterson Lecture – awarded by The Royal Society
- 2001 Adams Prize – awarded by the Faculty of Mathematics, University of Cambridge
