= Twistor (book) =

1989 novel by John G. Cramer

- First edition
- Author: John G. Cramer
- Language: English
- Publisher: William Morrow
- Publication date: 1989
- ISBN: 0-87795-967-6 (first edition)
- Dewey Decimal: 813.54
- LC Class: PS3553.R2674 T8

Twistor (1989) is a hard science fiction novel by physicist and science fiction writer John G. Cramer. The novel was first published in hardcover by William Morrow in 1989, then in mass market paperback by Avon Books in 1991. It was reprinted by Avon Books in 1997 with slight revisions.

== Plot ==
A condensed matter physics experiment in a university's physics lab causes an unexpected result when the equipment starts swapping normal and "shadow matter." After industrial espionage causes problems, physicist David Harrison finds himself lost with two small children in an alternate universe where the six-legged wildlife is dangerous and aggressive. David has to find a way back home, while dealing with the spies that caused the problems in the first place.

== Twistor theory ==
Twistor space is the geometry that results from solutions of twistor equations. In 1967 Roger Penrose developed a general relativity approach called twistor theory to apply to the study of quantum gravity. This theory proposes that the relationship between events in spacetime is crucial and focuses on causes as key to understanding the byproducts of these events.

== Critical reception ==
Publishers Weekly called the central situation appealing, but the reviewer noted, "Given Cramer's dry, stiff, academic prose and the equally dry, stiff, academic characters, the interesting and dramatic kernel of physics speculation will open only to the most persistent of readers." SF Signal called it an "excellent, page-turning, hard sf thriller."
