= Aephraim M. Steinberg =

Physicist

Aephraim M. Steinberg FRSC
- Education: Yale University (BS); UC Berkeley (PhD)
- Scientific career
- Fields: Quantum physics
- Workplaces: University of Toronto
- Thesis: [ProQuest 304079188 When can light go faster than light? The tunneling time and its sub-femtosecond measurement via quantum interference] (1994)
- Doctoral advisor: Raymond Chiao

Aephraim M. Steinberg is a professor at the University of Toronto and founding member of the Centre for Quantum Information and Quantum Control. His work also addresses open questions in fundamental quantum mechanical concepts and historic experiments, such as mapping trajectories of photons passing through a double slit via weak measurement, or timing particles tunnelling through a barrier.

== Early life and education ==
Steinberg was interested in science from a young age, asking questions to his father, an electrical engineer, about the behaviour of electrons in circuits. He received his B.S. degree from Yale University in 1988, and went on to complete a Ph.D. in Physics at the University of California, Berkeley in 1994. As a graduate student, he was particularly interested in open questions and apparent paradoxes of quantum mechanics, though was told that he would hopefully "grow out of it". His 1994 thesis was entitled When can light go faster than light? The tunneling time and its sub-femtosecond measurement via quantum interference and it received an award from the American Physical Society. The publications containing the main results of Steinberg's doctoral work have been cited extensively and reached a wide audience through popular science publications like Scientific American.

== Career and research ==
In 2002, Steinberg started a quantum information research program with CIFAR, which has since been renewed multiple times. It supports fundamental research into quantum technology, including how best to utilize it for problems that are not tractable on current systems, and determining exactly what those problems might be.

In 2011, Steinberg was awarded first place by Physics World in its yearly "top 10 breakthroughs" for his work leading "weak measurements" to "to track the average paths of single photons passing through a Young’s double-slit experiment". Conventional interpretation of the quantum uncertainty principle suggests that it is impossible to determine both the position and momentum of a particle, thereby preventing an observer from finding out what the trajectory of a particle was when passing through the slits to reach its final position on the screen. Weak measurement allows experimentalists to circumvent this limitation by performing measurements that provide minimal information, and also minimally perturb the system as popularized by Yakir Aharonov and others. Ensemble averaging over many such measurements leads to final, more accurate results. The work was carried out using pairs of entangled photons generated by quantum dots. The researchers probed polarization states of the photons to verify that the weak measurements did not disturb the system at the magnitude the uncertainty principle would suggest.

Another project exploiting properties of light was an experimental implementation of a method to resolve details beyond the Rayleigh Criterion with phase measurements.

Steinberg has led work aiming to quantify how long a particle spends tunnelling through a barrier, confirming that the process is not instantaneous. Experiments were carried out using cooled rubidium atoms guided through a laser beam as a barrier. By applying a magnetic field and measuring the atoms' spin before and after tunnelling, a time estimate was obtained.

Steinberg has stated that he enjoys encouraging physicists to embrace new perspectives, including asking "forbidden questions". He appeared in an episode of Through the Wormhole.

== Awards and honours ==
- 2021 named "University Professor" at the University of Toronto in recognition of his numerous and continued contributions to quantum physics since joining the university in 1996.
- 2020 one of five Physics World quantum highlights for "Measuring quantum tunnelling time".
- 2016 Fellow of the Royal Society of Canada (FRSC)
- 2011 Physics World Breakthrough of the Year.
- 2009 Optica Fellow for "pioneering experimental and theoretical contributions to quantum optics and information, particularly concerning tunneling times, quantum measurement, and the generation and characterization of entangled states".
- 2008 Fellow of the American Physical Society for "pioneering theoretical and experimental contributions to the understanding of fundamental quantum phenomena including photon and atom tunneling and the quantum information stored in cold atomic gases".
- 2007 E.W.R. Steacie Memorial Fellowship.
- 2006 McLean Award.
- 2006 Herzberg Medal for "seminal experimental and theoretical work on superluminal effects, entanglement of more than two photons, Bose-Einstein condensation of cold atoms, and quantum information", awarded by the Canadian Association of Physicists.
- 2006 Rutherford Memorial Medal from the Royal Society of Canada.
- 1999 Premier’s Research Excellence Award.
- 1997 Polanyi Prize.
- 1996 Deborah Jin Award for Outstanding Doctoral Thesis Research in Atomic, Molecular, or Optical Physics.
