= Lucien Hardy =

British physicist

- Education: Durham University (PhD)
- Known for: Hardy's paradox
- Scientific career
- Fields: Quantum foundations Quantum information Quantum gravity
- Workplaces: University of Waterloo
- Thesis: Nonlocality, violation of lorentz in variance, and wave-particle duality in quantum theory (1992)
- Doctoral advisor: Euan J. Squires
- Website: https://perimeterinstitute.ca/people/lucien-hardy

Lucien Hardy (born 1966) is a British-Canadian theoretical physicist currently based at the Perimeter Institute for Theoretical Physics in Waterloo, Canada.

Hardy is best known for his work on the foundation of quantum physics, including the Hardy's paradox thought experiment, and his influential work in quantum field theory, which seeks to reconcile quantum mechanics to general relativity.

== Education ==
Hardy studied for his doctorate at Durham University (1989–1992) under the supervision of Euan J. Squires.

== Work ==
In 1992, he became lecturer in mathematical physics at Maynooth College, part of The National University of Ireland. He was subsequently a Royal Society postdoctoral fellow at the University of Innsbruck (1993–1994), then returned to Durham as Lecturer (1994–1996), and was a postdoctoral fellow at La Sapienza University (1996–1997).

Starting in 1997, he was a Royal Society University Research Fellow at the University of Oxford until 2002.

Hardy is now affiliated with the University of Waterloo and is among the faculty of the Perimeter Institute for Theoretical Physics.

=== Hardy's paradox ===
In 1992, Hardy published a thought experiment that "makes nonsense of the famous interaction between matter and antimatter" — that when a particle meets its antiparticle, the pair "always annihilate one another" in a burst of energy. Hardy proposed the possibility that in some cases when said interaction is not observed a particle and an antiparticle could interact with one another and survive. But since the interaction has to remain unseen, no one would notice this happening, which is why the result came to be known as Hardy's paradox.

=== Quantum Theory From Five Reasonable Axioms ===
In 2001, Hardy published Quantum Theory From Five Reasonable Axioms, a paper that offered an axiomatic reconstruction of quantum theory. His proposal represented an "operational" approach made famous by Albert Einstein, but applied to quantum mechanics.

In subsequent years, other authors built upon Hardy's work by proposing their own variants.
