= Raymond Chiao =

American physicist

Raymond Y. Chiao
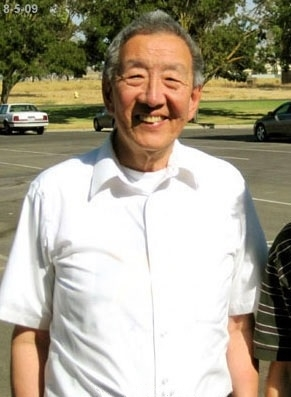
- Raymond Chiao outside his UC Merced Lab
- Born: October 9, 1940 (age 85); British Hong Kong
- Education: MIT; Princeton University
- Known for: Measuring the tunneling time, observation of Berry's topological phase
- Awards: Willis E. Lamb Award for Laser Science and Quantum Optics (2006); Einstein Prize for Laser Science (awarded at Lasers '93)
- Scientific career
- Fields: Physics
- Workplaces: UC Merced; Berkeley; MIT
- Thesis: Brillouin scattering and coherent phonon generation (1965)
- Doctoral advisor: Charles Hard Townes
- Doctoral students: Paul Kwiat; Aephraim M. Steinberg

Raymond Y. Chiao is an American physicist best known for his experimental work in quantum optics. He is currently an emeritus faculty member at the University of California, Merced physics department, where he is conducting research on gravitational radiation in collaboration with Prof. Jay Sharping.

== Biography ==
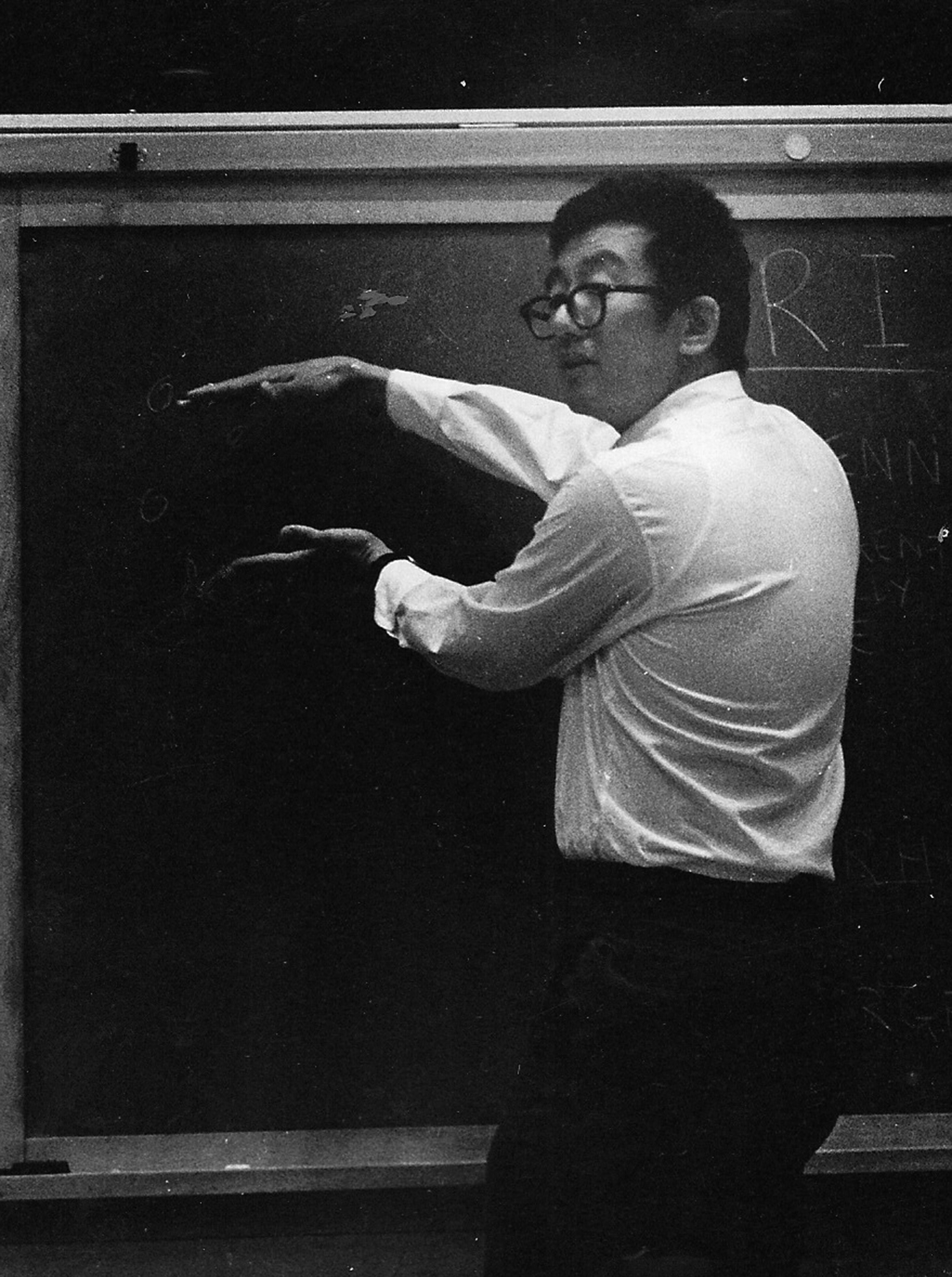
Raymond Chiao lecturing at Physics of Quantum Electronics (PQE) summer school, Flagstaff, AZ (1968)

Raymond Chiao was born in Hong Kong on October 9, 1940, and moved as a child to the United States in 1947. He grew up in New York City, where he attended Collegiate School. It was there that he first got interested in science through reading Gamow’s book One Two Three... Infinity.

He was admitted to Princeton University in 1957 as an electrical engineer, but then switched to the physics department, where he worked on a senior thesis project given to him by John Archibald Wheeler on the quantization of general relativity. He then switched from theoretical physics to experimental physics in graduate studies at MIT under the supervision of Charles Hard Townes, shortly after the experimental realization of the ruby laser. His thesis topic was on the first observation of stimulated Brillouin scattering.

After obtaining his Ph.D. in 1965 from MIT, he taught as an assistant professor there until 1967. He moved to UC Berkeley in 1967, and remained there until 2006, where he advised at least 11 PhD students. After which he took a position at the UC's newly opened campus UC Merced.

== Discoveries ==
Chiao has become well known in the field of quantum optics due to several important experiments. Based on former experiments carried out by Günter Nimtz in 1992 he measured the quantum tunnelling time, which was found to be between 1.5 and 1.7 times the speed of light. Interpretation of these results is open to question (see references below pertaining to tunneling time). He also was the first to measure the topological Berry's Phase (Geometric phase).

== Current work ==
As of 2006, he accepted a faculty position at UC Merced and turned his full energy on the project of detecting gravitational waves through the use of superconductors. As of 2010 he became emeritus faculty but he continues to advise several PhD Students.

== Bibliography ==
=== Books ===
- Chiao, Raymond Y. (1996). Amazing light: a volume dedicated to Charles Hard Townes on his 80th birthday. New York: Springer. ISBN 0-387-94658-6.
- Garrison, John C.; Chiao, Raymond Y. (2008). Quantum optics. Oxford University Press. ISBN 978-0-19-850886-1.
- Chiao, Raymond Y.; Cohen, Marvin L.; Leggett, Anthony J.; Phillips, William D.; Harper, Charles L., eds. (2010). Visions of discovery new light on physics, cosmology, and consciousness. Cambridge University Press. ISBN 978-1-108-92872-4.

=== Articles ===
- Tomita, Akira; Chiao, Raymond Y. (August 25, 1986). "Observation of Berry's Topological Phase by Use of an Optical Fiber". Physical Review Letters. 57 (8): 937–940. doi:10.1103/PhysRevLett.57.937.
- Steinberg, Aephraim M.; Kwiat, Paul G.; Chiao, Raymond Y. (August 2, 1993). "Measurement of the Single-Photon Tunneling Time". Physical Review Letters. 71 (5). American Physical Society: 708–711. doi:10.1103/PhysRevLett.71.708.
- Steinberg, Aephraim M.; Chiao, Raymond. Y (May 1, 1994). "Tunneling delay times in one and two dimensions". Physical Review A. 49 (5). American Physical Society: 3283–3295. doi:10.1103/PhysRevA.49.3283.
