= Dorit Aharonov =

Israeli computer scientist

- דורית אהרונוב
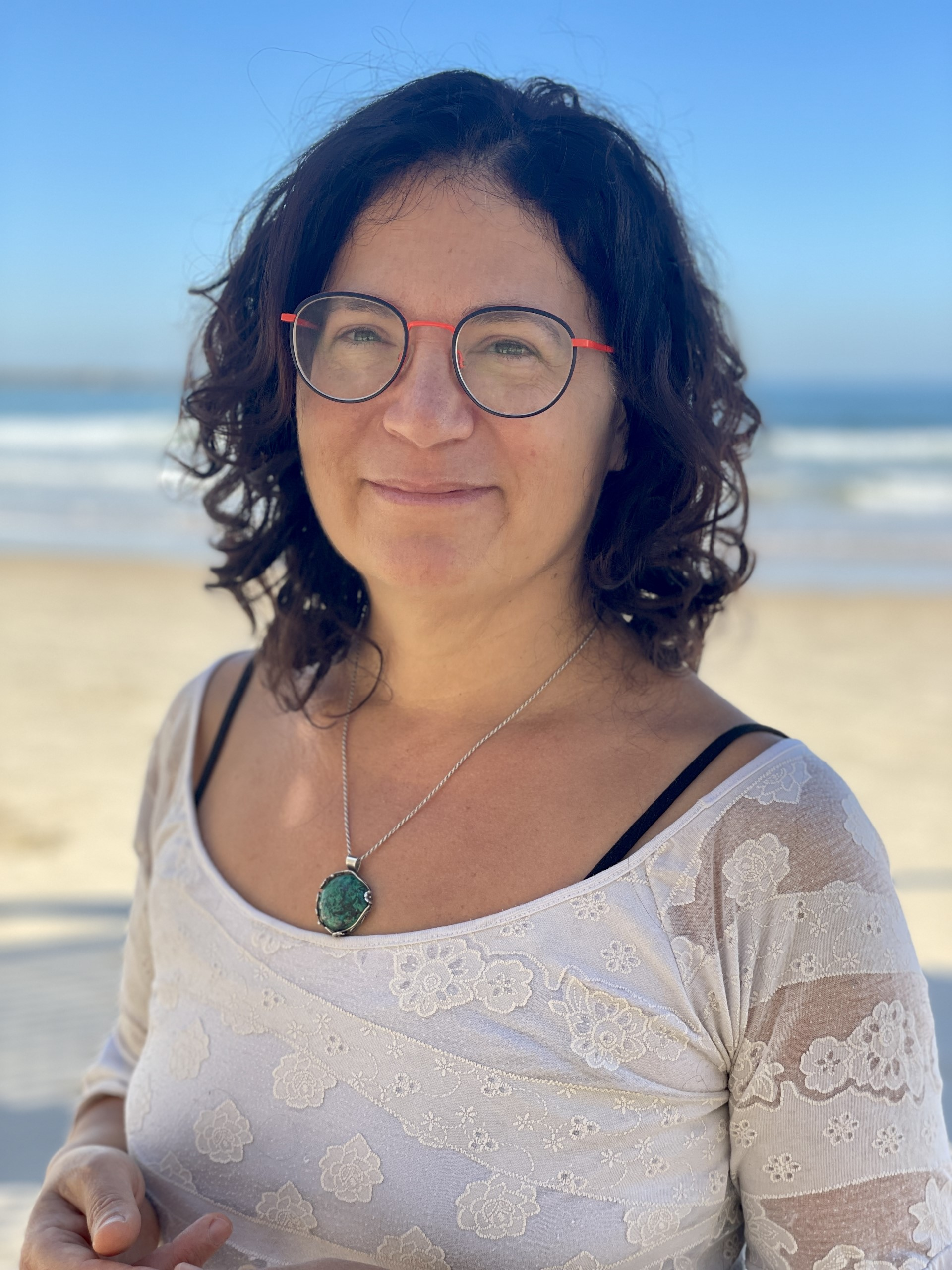
- Born: 1970 (age 55–56)
- Education: Hebrew University (B.Sc., Ph.D.); Weizmann Institute of Science (M.Sc.); Princeton University (post-doctorate); University of California Berkeley (post-doctorate)
- Known for: Aharonov–Jones–Landau algorithm Quantum threshold theorem
- Awards: Krill Prize for Excellence in Scientific Research
- Scientific career
- Fields: Quantum computing
- Workplaces: Hebrew University
- Thesis: Noisy Quantum Computation (1998)
- Doctoral advisor: Avi Wigderson; Michael Ben-Or

Dorit Aharonov (Hebrew: דורית אהרונוב; born 1970) is an Israeli computer scientist specializing in quantum computing. She is known for her works on quantum algorithms. The Aharonov–Jones–Landau algorithm is named after her.

== Biography ==
Aharonov was born in Washington, D.C. and grew up in Haifa, the daughter of the mathematician Dov Aharonov and the niece of the physicist Yakir Aharonov.

Aharonov graduated from Weizmann Institute of Science with an MSc in physics. She received her doctorate for Computer Science in 1999 from the Hebrew University of Jerusalem, and her thesis was entitled Noisy Quantum Computation. She also did her post-doctorate in the mathematics department of Princeton University and in the computer science department of University of California Berkeley. She was a visiting scholar at the Institute for Advanced Study in 1998–99.

Aharonov has won several awards for her research work. In 2005 she was chosen by Nature magazine as one of the four "most prominent young theorists in their field", and the following year she was awarded the Creel Prize for excellence in scientific research.

Aharonov was an invited speaker in International Congress of Mathematicians 2010, Hyderabad on the topic of "Mathematical Aspects of Computer Science".

In 2020, she co-founded Qedma Quantum Computing, a company that develops tools for error suppression and error mitigation in quantum computing. She is the company's chief scientific officer.

She was elected a Member of the National Academy of Sciences in 2024.

== Honors and awards ==
- 2006 - Krill Prize for Excellence in Scientific Research
- 2014 - the Michael Bruno Memorial Award
- 2024 - elected Member of the National Academy of Sciences
