= Qedma Quantum Computing =

- Type: Private company
- Industry: Quantum Computing
- Founded: 2020
- Headquarters: Tel Aviv Israel
- Key people: Asif Sinay (CEO); Natanel Lindner (Chief technology officer); Dorit Aharonov (Chief scientific officer)
- Products: QESEM (Quantum Error Suppression and Error Mitigation)
- Number of employees: 40
- Website: www.qedma.com

Qedma Quantum Computing is an Israeli company that develops tools for error suppression and error mitigation in quantum computing. It focuses on software methods intended to improve the reliability of results obtained from noisy quantum processors.

== History ==
Qedma was founded in 2020 by Asif Sinay (CEO, a graduate of the Talpiot program), Natanel Lindner (Chief Technology Officer, professor of physics at the Technion), and Dorit Aharonov (Chief Scientific Officer and professor at the Hebrew University of Jerusalem, whose research focuses on quantum computing). Qedma raised $4.7 million in seed funding from TPY Capital and the Technion – Israel Institute of Technology.

In July 2025, Qedma raised $26 million in a series A round led by Glilot Capital Partners, with participation from IBM, Korean Investment Partners, and TPY Capital. The company is based in Tel Aviv and employs 40 people, 18 of whom hold Phd in mathematics or physics.

== Technology and products ==
Qedma’s product is QESEM (Quantum Error Suppression and Error Mitigation). It aims to improve quantum computing performance in two ways: by preventing errors before they occur and by reducing their effects after they occur.

In September 2024, its software was integrated with IBM Eagle and IBM Heron processors. In July 2026, two research papers involving Qedma and collaborating institutions were published as preprints. In the first, the company used QESEM on an IBM Heron r3 processor and observed magnetic oscillations in systems of up to 74 qubits. The results were compared with simulations performed on the Fugaku supercomputer and an Nvidia H100 GPU server, which were limited to 51 qubits. The work was conducted in collaboration with the Riken institute. Second, a year-long test using Quantinuum’s H2 and Helios trapped-ion quantum computer produced similar results. The test was conducted as part of Quantinuum's Startup Partner Program.

In September 2026, Qedma announced the results of an experiment conducted in collaboration with researchers from the University of Copenhagen, Technical University of Denmark, and the University of Southern Denmark. The experiment reported improved precision in a quantum calculation using QESEM software. In September 2026, Qedma integrated its software into Nvidia’s CUDA-Q.
