= Satoshi Watanabe (physicist) =

Japanese physicist

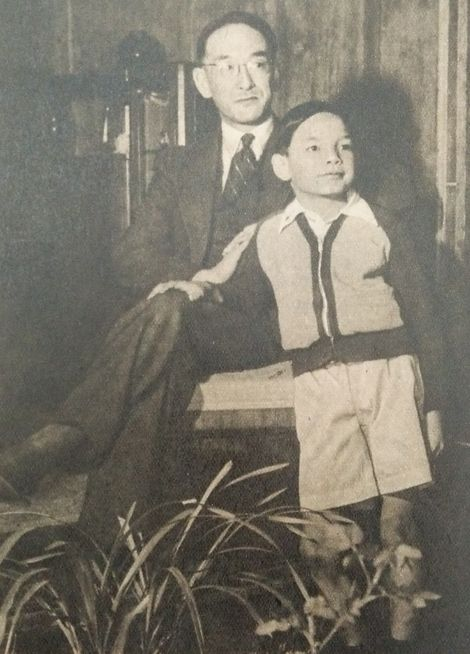
- Watanabe and his son, May 1949
- Born: May 26, 1910; Tokyo
- Died: October 15, 1993 (aged 83); Tokyo
- Other name: 渡辺 慧
- Scientific career
- Fields: Theoretical physics

Satoshi Watanabe (渡辺 慧, Watanabe Satoshi; 26 May 1910 – 15 October 1993) was a theoretical physicist. He studied various topics, such as the time reversal of quantum mechanics, pattern recognition, cognitive science, and the concept of time. He was the first physicist who claimed that quantum probability theory is time-asymmetric (irreversible; non-invariant under time reversal), and reject the conventional analysis of the time reversal of probability laws. He developed the Double Inferential Vector Formalism (DIVF), later known as the Two-state vector formalism (TSVF), which is sometimes interpreted as contradicting his claim of time-asymmetry, but this is a misunderstanding. He also proposed the Ugly duckling theorem.

== Early life and education ==
Satoshi Watanabe was born on May 26, 1910, in Tokyo. He attended Gakushuuin Middle High School and Tokyo High School. In 1933, he graduated from Tokyo Imperial University in theoretical physics, where Torahiko Terada was his teacher.

The imperial government sent him to France to study. Louis de Broglie encouraged Watanabe to study thermodynamics and wave mechanics.

In 1937, he moved to Leipzig and started to study nuclear theory under Heisenberg. In the same year, Watanabe married Dorothea Dauer, a scholar of German literature.

In 1939, at the beginning of World War II, he left Germany and stayed with Niels Bohr for a time. In December, he returned to Japan with his family.

== Career ==
In Japan, he worked at the Physical and Chemical Research Institute (Rikagaku Kenkyujo) at Tokyo Imperial University as an assistant professor, and as a physics professor at Rikkyo University. In 1950, he left for the United States.

His argument that quantum mechanics is time-asymmetric (irreversible; non-invariant under the time reversal transformation) is repeated in a number of his papers (1955; 1965; 1966; 1972). This result means that physicists have used the wrong transformation of probability laws to represent time reversal, and the claims that quantum mechanics is time reversal invariant are invalid. Watanabe's argument has not been accepted by physicists or philosophers however. The assumption that quantum mechanics is time symmetric on the basis of conventional proofs is almost universal in the literature on time in physics to this day.

He developed the Double Inferential Vector Formalism (DIVF), later known as the Two-state vector formalism (TSVF). The DSVF/TSVF is often interpreted as a time-symmetric interpretation of quantum mechanics (see Minority interpretations of quantum mechanics). However Watanabe considered that the normal physical theory of quantum mechanics that holds for real physics is time-asymmetric. He consequently rejected the conventional view that physical time asymmetry is only explained by asymmetric boundary conditions on the universe, and claimed it is a law-like feature of quantum physics.

Time-symmetric interpretations of quantum mechanics were first suggested by Walter Schottky in 1921, and later by several other scientists. Watanabe proposed that information given by forwards evolving quantum states is not complete; rather, both forwards and backwards evolving quantum states are required to describe a quantum state: a first state vector that evolves from the initial conditions towards the future, and a second state vector that evolves backwards in time from future boundary conditions. Past and future measurements, taken together, provide complete information about a quantum system. Watanabe's work was later rediscovered by Yakir Aharonov, Peter Bergmann and Joel Lebowitz in 1964, who later renamed it the Two-state vector formalism (TSVF).

In 1956, he became a researcher at the IBM Watson Laboratory and started to build his own information theory based on quantum mechanics. He taught at Yale University and the University of Hawaii, became chairman of the International Time Academy, and was the Vice President of International Philosophy Academy.

On October 15, 1993, he died in Tokyo.

== Family ==
His father, Chifuyu Watanabe, was a Minister of Justice at Second Wakatsuki Cabinet. His elder brother, Takeshi Watanabe, was Vice Minister of Finance for International Affairs and director general of Asia Development Bank. His wife, Dorothea Dauer Watanabe, was a professor of German (language and literature) at the University of Hawaii. His son, Francis Watanabe Dauer, is an author.

== See also ==
- Total correlation
- Granular computing
- Charles Sanders Peirce

== Bibliography ==
- Le deuxième théorème de la thermodynamique et la mécanique ondulatoire, Paris : Herman et Cie, 1935
- Knowing and guessing : a quantitative study of inference and information, New York : John Wiley & Sons, 1969 ISBN 0-471-92130-0
- Pattern recognition : human and mechanical, New York : John Wiley & Sons, 1985 ISBN 0-471-80815-6
