= John G. Cramer =

American novelist

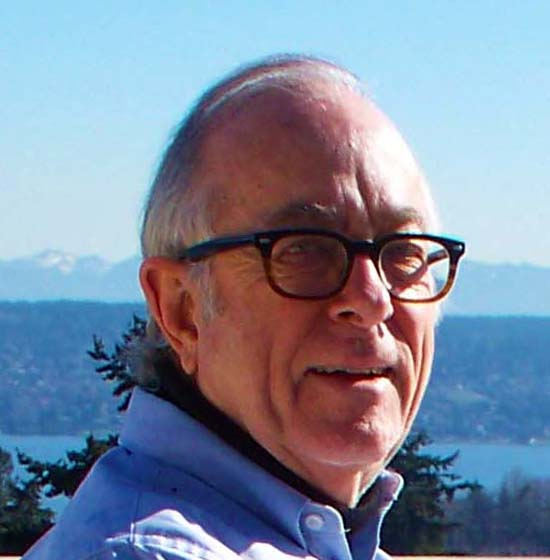
- Cramer in 2012
- Born: John Gleason Cramer, Jr. October 24, 1934 (age 91); Houston, Texas, U.S.
- Education: Rice University
- Known for: Transactional interpretation of quantum mechanics
- Spouse: Pauline Cramer
- Children: Kathryn Cramer
- Scientific career
- Fields: Nuclear physics, Quantum physics, Ultra-relativistic heavy ion physics, HBT interferometry
- Workplaces: University of Washington
- Doctoral advisor: Calvin M. Class
- Website: John Cramer's Home Page

John Gleason Cramer Jr. (born October 24, 1934) is a professor emeritus of physics at the University of Washington in Seattle, Washington, known for his development of the transactional interpretation of quantum mechanics. He has been an active participant with the STAR experiment at the Relativistic Heavy Ion Collider (RHIC) at Brookhaven National Laboratory, and the particle accelerator at CERN in Geneva, Switzerland.

== Early years ==
John Cramer was born in Houston, Texas. He attended Mirabeau B Lamar High School in Houston, and graduated with a BA in physics from Rice University in 1957. He continued his studies, graduating with an MA in physics from Rice University in 1959 and a Ph.D. in physics from Rice University in 1961.

== Career ==
After serving as a post-doctoral fellow at Indiana University from 1961 to 1963, Cramer continued as an assistant professor at the same university from 1963 to 1964. He was an assistant professor at the University of Washington from 1964 to 1968, an associate professor from 1968 to 1974, and was appointed as a full professor in 1974.

From 2007 to 2014, Cramer investigated the possibility that quantum nonlocality might be used for communication between observers through the use of switchable interference patterns. In the course of this work, he gained new understanding of the "show stopper" within the quantum formalism that prevents such nonlocal signaling: For each interference pattern, nature also provides and superimposes an "anti-interference pattern". These are always combined in a way that "erases" potential nonlocal signals. The two interference patterns complement each other, resulting in no perceptible interference pattern. Measurement changes can dramatically modify the individual interference patterns, but always so that this erasure occurs. In this way, nature is protected from the possibility of retrocausal signaling and its consequences and paradoxes.

Cramer has been making regular appearances on the Science Channel and on NPR Science Friday.

== Writing ==
In addition to his approximately 300 scientific publications in peer-reviewed journals, John Cramer writes a regular column, "The Alternate View", appearing in every second issue, for Analog Science Fiction and Fact magazine. In July 1986, he published the transactional interpretation of quantum mechanics which is inspired by the Wheeler–Feynman time-symmetric theory.

His book on quantum mechanics, The Quantum Handshake: Entanglement, Nonlocality and Transactions (2015), published by Springer Verlag, is a comprehensive introduction to the transactional interpretation.

Cramer's simulation of the sound of the Big Bang attracted some mainstream press attention in late 2003 and again in 2013. The simulation originated with an "Alternate View" article, "BOOMERanG and the Sound of the Big Bang" (January 2001). Cramer describes the sound as "rather like a large jet plane 100 feet off the ground flying over your house in the middle of the night."

Cramer has published three novels, Twistor (1989), Einstein's Bridge (1997) and Fermi's Question (2023), all within the hard science fiction genre. Cramer was the 2010 Science Guest of Honor at Norwescon, a large science fiction and fantasy convention in the Seattle area due to his physics fact columns in Analog Science Fiction and Fact.

== Bibliography ==
=== Non-fiction ===
- The quantum handshake: entanglement, nonlocality and transactions. New York: Springer. 2015.

=== Novels ===
- Cramer, John (1989). Twistor. New York: Morrow.
  - — (2016) [1989]. Twistor. Introduction by Gene Wolfe (Dover paperback ed.). Mineola, N.Y.: Dover Publications.
- — (1997). Einstein's bridge. New York: Avon Books.
- — (2023). Fermi's question (E-book). New York: Baen Books.

== Awards and recognition ==
- Elected Fellow, American Association for the Advancement of Science (1991);
- Nominated for the John W. Campbell Award for Best New Writer (1991);
- Listed in Who's Who in America (from 43rd Edition, 1984);
- Elected Fellow, American Physical Society (1974);
- National Science Foundation Fellow at Rice University (1959–61);
- Sigma-Xi Thesis Award at Rice University (1959);
- Bausch-Lomb Science Award at Lamar High School Graduation (1953);

== Personal life ==
Cramer married Pauline Ruth Bond in June, 1961. The couple have three children: Kathryn Cramer (born April, 1962), John G. Cramer III (born January 1964), and Karen Cramer (born April 1967).
