= Einstein's Bridge (novel) =

1997 novel by John G. Cramer

- Cover to Einstein's Bridge
- Author: John G. Cramer
- Language: English
- Genre: hard science fiction, Alternate history
- Publisher: Avon Books
- Publication date: June 1997
- Publication place: United States
- Media type: Print (Hardback & Paperback), eBook

Einstein's Bridge is a hard science fiction novel by physicist and science fiction writer John G. Cramer.

== Publication history ==
The novel was published in June 1997 by Avon Books. The hardback and trade paperback were followed by a mass-market paperback in 1998. The novel is out of print as of 2016.

== Plot ==
The plot revolves around three characters, George Griffin, Roger Coulton, and Alice Lang. Set between the years 1987 and 2004, the book details the efforts of physicists George and Roger as they work to bring the Superconducting Super Collider (SSC) online in Waxahachie, Texas. Alice is a novelist who becomes involved with the pair while researching material for her new horror book at the SSC. She and George fall in love just as preliminary trial runs of the SSC produce an unexplained phenomenon: a Snark, to borrow an expression from Lewis Carroll, or an impossible event, in the form of a heavy particle which emerged from the planned head-on collision between two 20 TeV protons inside the SSC.

In addition to violating physical laws such as the conservation of mass, this particle emits pulses of radioactivity, spelling out the numerical prime number sequence of 2-3-5-7-11-13-17-19-23-29-31-37. Therein begins the unraveling of an even greater mystery than the particle: a powerful intelligence is behind this event, seeking to communicate with humankind, which has unwittingly announced itself to the universe through the powerful bursts of energy unleashed from the collisions of particles within the SSC. For a while, first contact is conducted by a benevolent species. A different species is also working to make contact—a less benevolent one, who may ultimately destroy the Earth and perhaps even the fabric of the universe.

The plot does not occur on our timeline but in an alternative history—one in which the Superconducting Super Collider was completed in Texas. In reality, the project was cancelled in 1993 and never implemented. In this alternate history, American forces invaded Baghdad and overthrew Saddam Hussein after liberating Kuwait during the Gulf War (1990-1991), leading to George H. W. Bush's re-election in 1992 over Bill Clinton. The sinister significance of all this, and the relation of the alternative history to us, becomes clear in the end.

== Critical reception ==
In reviewing the novel, SF Site said, "Cramer weaves a compelling tale." Kirkus Reviews noted "Cramer splendidly demonstrates just how fascinating and mind-boggling real science can be, and shows exactly how vulnerable basic research is to political whim."
