= Lev Vaidman =

Russian-Israeli physicist

- לב ויידמן
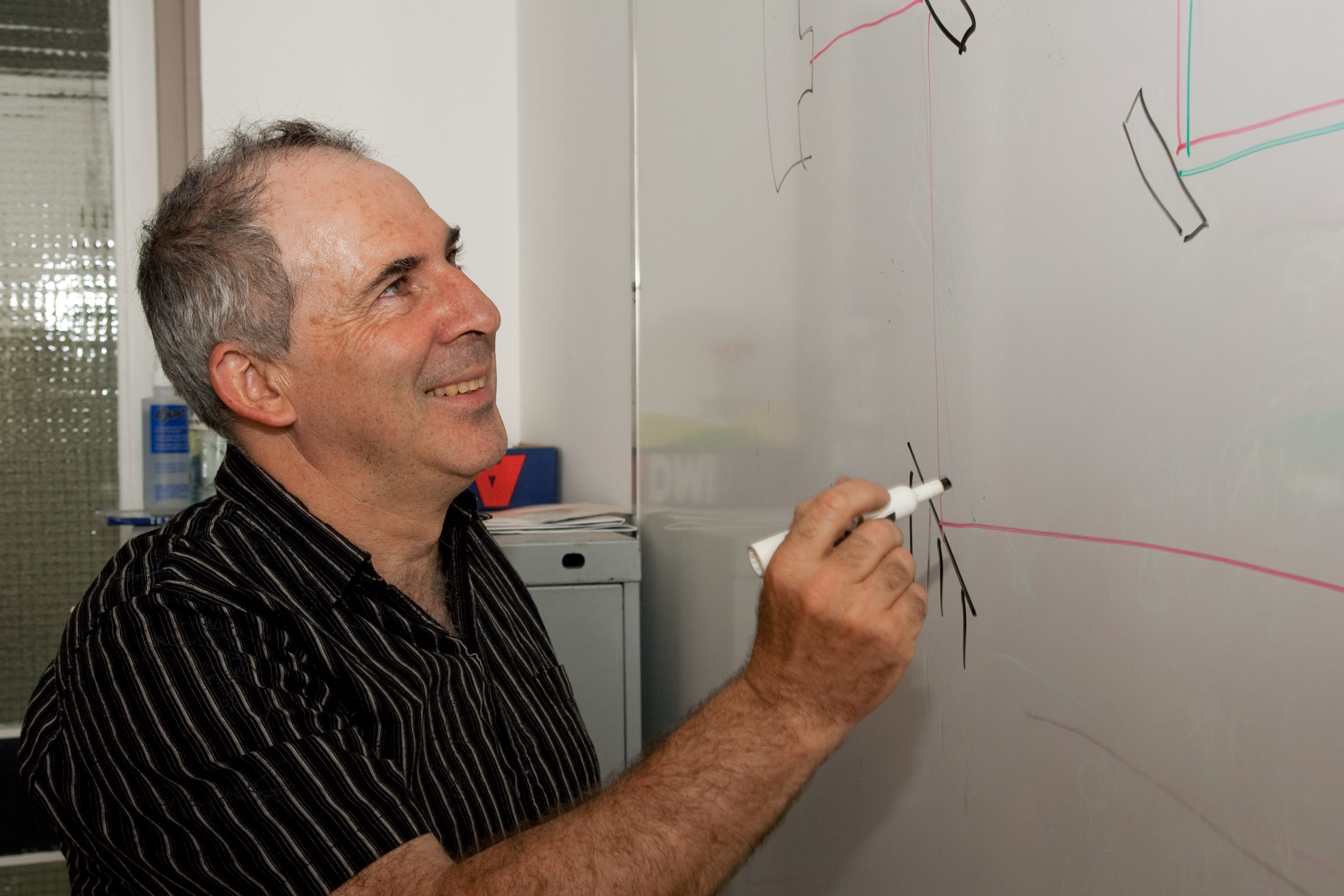
- Born: 4 September 1955 (age 67); Leningrad, Soviet Union
- Education: Hebrew University of Jerusalem; Weizmann Institute of Science
- Known for: Elitzur–Vaidman bomb-tester
- Scientific career
- Fields: Quantum mechanics Quantum information,
- Workplaces: Tel Aviv University

Lev Vaidman (Hebrew: לב ויידמן; born 4 September 1955) is a Russian-Israeli physicist and professor at Tel Aviv University, Israel. He is noted for his theoretical work in the area of fundamentals of quantum mechanics, which includes quantum teleportation, the Elitzur–Vaidman bomb tester, and the weak values. He was a member of the Editorial Advisory Board of The American Journal of Physics from 2007 to 2009. In 2010, the Elitzur–Vaidman bomb tester was chosen as one of the "Seven Wonders of the Quantum World" by New Scientist Magazine.

== Personal life ==
He attended 45th Physics-Mathematics School in Saint Petersburg and was twice among the winners of the All-Soviet high school students Physics Olympiad (first place in 1971 and second place in 1972), and in 1972 scored 26th in the International Physics Olympiad in Bucharest. Vaidman emigrated with his family to Israel at the age of 18. Prior to that, he studied for one year at Saint Petersburg University (then Leningrad University).

== The Elitzur–Vaidman bomb tester ==
This thought experiment, subsequently conducted in the lab, is an example of interaction-free measurement (IFM). IFM is the detection of the property of an object or its presence without any physical interaction between the observer and the object. Obtaining information from an object in such a manner is paradoxical.

The bomb tester works by employing an interferometer. When a photon is fired into the device, it encounters a half-silvered mirror positioned so as to reflect the photon at a ninety-degree angle. There is a 50-50 chance it will be reflected or pass through. Due to the quantum properties of the photon, it both passes through the mirror and is reflected off of it.

Now, the same photon is moving through two different parts of the device. The photon that passed through the mirror is now on the "lower path". It may or may not encounter a bomb, which is designed to explode if it encounters a single photon. The photon that was reflected off the mirror is now on the "upper path". Both photons next encounter a normal mirror. The lower-path photon is reflected ninety-degrees upward (if it did not detect a bomb). The upper-path photon is reflected back ninety degrees so that it is returned to its original trajectory.

If the lower-path photon did not detect a bomb, it will arrive at a second half-silvered mirror at the same time as the upper-path photon. This will result in the single photon interfering with itself.

A pair of detectors are positioned beyond the mirror in such a way that the photon's superposition collapses and the photon is observed to have either been on the upper path or the lower path, but not both. If the upper-path detector encounters the photon, then the photon "actually" took the upper path and no measurement was made of whether or not there was a bomb on the lower path. If, however, the lower-path detector encounters a photon, it can be determined that fifty percent of the time, there is a bomb on the lower path--without actually encountering it.

Vaidman has argued that this lends support to the many-worlds interpretation of quantum mechanics.

== Teleportation of continuous variables ==
Vaidman is a pioneer in the area of quantum teleportation. He has demonstrated that non-local measurements can be used to teleport unknown quantum states of systems with continuous variables.

== See also ==
- Avshalom Elitzur
- Elitzur–Vaidman bomb tester
- Englert–Greenberger duality relation
- Interaction-free measurement
- Many-worlds interpretation
