= Yakir Aharonov =

Israeli physicist (born 1932)

- יקיר אהרונוב
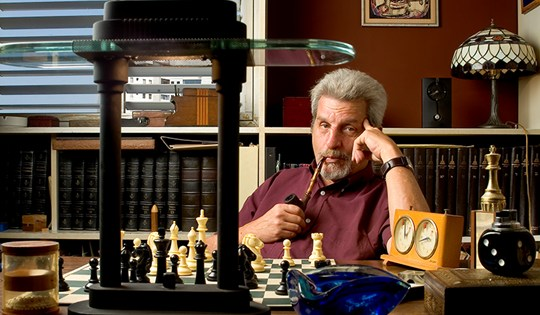
- Born: 28 August 1932 (age 94); Haifa, British Mandate of Palestine
- Education: Technion (BSc); Bristol University (PhD)
- Known for: Aharonov–Bohm effect Aharonov–Casher effect Weak values Two-state vector formalism Quantum Cheshire cat
- Relatives: Dorit Aharonov
- Awards: Weizmann Prize (1984); Elliott Cresson Medal (1991); Wolf Prize (1998); National Medal of Science (2009)
- Scientific career
- Fields: Quantum physics
- Workplaces: Perimeter Institute; Chapman University; Tel Aviv University; University of South Carolina; George Mason University; Brandeis University; Yeshiva University
- Doctoral advisor: David Bohm
- Doctoral students: Avshalom Elitzur; Lev Vaidman; Sandu Popescu

Yakir Aharonov ForMemRS (Hebrew: יקיר אהרונוב; born August 28, 1932) is an Israeli physicist specializing in quantum physics. He has been a Professor of Theoretical Physics and the James J. Farley Professor of Natural Philosophy at Chapman University in California since 2008. He was a distinguished professor in the Perimeter Institute between 2009-2012 and is a professor emeritus at Tel Aviv University and at University of South Carolina. He is president of the IYAR, the Israeli Institute for Advanced Research.

In June 2024 he was elected to serve in the Royal Society of London.

== Biography ==
Yakir Aharonov was born in Haifa. He received his undergraduate education at the Technion – Israel Institute of Technology in Haifa, graduating with a BSc in 1956. He continued his graduate studies at the Technion and then moved to Bristol University, UK together with his doctoral advisor David Bohm, receiving a Ph.D. degree in 1960. Aharonov later taught at Brandeis University from 1960 to 1961 and the Yeshiva University from 1964 to 1967, both in the United States.

Aharonov is married to Nily, an educational psychologist, and has two children. His brother, Dov Aharonov, is a professor emeritus at the Faculty of Mathematics at the Technion, and his niece, Dorit Aharonov, is a professor at the School of Engineering and Computer Science at the Hebrew University of Jerusalem.

== Academic career ==
Aharonov's research interests are quantum field theories, nonlocal and topological effects in quantum mechanics, and interpretations of quantum mechanics. In 1959, he and David Bohm proposed the Aharonov–Bohm effect for which he co-received the 1998 Wolf Prize.

In 1988, Aharonov, David Albert, and Lev Vaidman published their theory of weak values. This work was motivated by Aharonov's long-time quest to experimentally verify his theory that events in quantum mechanics that appear to be random are caused by events in the future (two-state vector formalism). Verifying a present effect of a future cause requires a measurement, and that would ordinarily destroy coherence and ruin the experiment. He and his colleagues claim that they were able to use weak measurements and verify the present effect of a future cause. Working with Aharon Casher, they predicted the Aharonov–Casher effect, the electrodynamic dual of the Aharonov–Bohm effect with magnetic dipoles and charges.

=== Timeline ===
- 1960–1961: Research Associate, Brandeis University
- 1961–1964: Assistant Professor, Yeshiva University
- 1964–1967: Associate Professor, Yeshiva University
- 1967–1973: Joint professorship at Tel Aviv University and Yeshiva University
- 1973–2006: Joint professorship at Tel Aviv University and the University of South Carolina
- 2006–2008: Professor at George Mason University
- 2008–present: Professor of Theoretical Physics and the James J. Farley Professor of Natural Philosophy at Chapman University

== Awards and recognition ==
- 1978: Elected Fellow of the American Physical Society
- 1984: Weizmann Prize in Physics
- 1984: Rothschild Prize in Physics
- 1989: Israel Prize in exact science
- 1990: Elected to the Israel Academy of Sciences and Humanities
- 1991: The Elliott Cresson Medal – The Franklin Institute
- 1992: Honorary Doctor of Science, Technion – Israel Institute of Technology
- 1993: Elected Member of the National Academy of Sciences, USA
- 1993: Honorary Doctor of Science, University of South Carolina, USA
- 1995: Hewlett–Packard Europhysics Prize
- 1997: Honorary Doctor of Science, Bristol University, UK
- 1998: Wolf Prize in Physics with Michael Berry
- 1999: Honorary Doctor of Science, University of Buenos Aires, Argentina
- 2009: Selected Clarivate Citation laureate in Physics with Michael Berry.
- 2006: EMET Prize in Exact Science
- In 2009, the information service Thomson Reuters named Aharonov as leading candidate for the 2009 Nobel Prize in Physics, based on his work's influence on quantum physics.
- 2010: National Medal of Science (2009), awarded and presented by President Barack Obama
- 2024: Foreign Member of the Royal Society

== See also ==
- List of Israel Prize recipients
