= Weak measurement =

Measurement of a quantum system which minimally disturbs it

In quantum mechanics (and computation and information), weak measurement is a type of quantum measurement that results in an observer obtaining very little information about the system on average, but also disturbs the state very little. From Busch's theorem any quantum system is necessarily disturbed by measurement, but the amount of disturbance is described by a parameter called the measurement strength.

Weak measurement is a subset of the more general form of quantum measurement described by operators known as POVMs, where the strength of measurement is low. In the literature weak measurements are also known as unsharp, fuzzy, dull, noisy, approximate, and gentle measurements. Additionally weak measurements are often confused with the distinct but related concept of the weak value.

== History ==
Weak measurements were first thought about in the context of weak continuous measurements of quantum systems (i.e. quantum filtering and quantum trajectories). The physics of continuous quantum measurements is as follows. Consider using an ancilla, e.g. a field or a current, to probe a quantum system. The interaction between the system and the probe correlates the two systems. Typically the interaction only weakly correlates the system and ancilla (specifically, the interaction unitary operator need only to be expanded to first or second order in perturbation theory). By measuring the ancilla and then using quantum measurement theory, the state of the system conditioned on the results of the measurement can be determined. In order to obtain a strong measurement, many ancilla must be coupled and then measured. In the limit where there is a continuum of ancilla the measurement process becomes continuous in time. This process was described first by: Michael B. Mensky; Viacheslav Belavkin; Alberto Barchielli, L. Lanz, G. M. Prosperi; Barchielli; Carlton Caves; Caves and Gerard J. Milburn. Later on Howard Carmichael and Howard M. Wiseman also made important contributions to the field.

The notion of a weak measurement is often misattributed to Yakir Aharonov, David Albert and Lev Vaidman. In their article they consider an example of a weak measurement (and perhaps coin the phrase "weak measurement") and use it to motivate their definition of a weak value, which they defined there for the first time.

== Theory: Coupling to ancilla ==
There is no universally accepted definition of a weak measurement. One approach is to declare a weak measurement to be a generalized measurement where some or all of the Kraus operators are close to the identity. The approach taken below is to interact two systems weakly and then measure one of them. After detailing this approach we will illustrate it with examples.

=== Weak interaction and ancilla-coupled measurement ===
Consider a system that starts in the quantum state $|\psi\rangle$ and an ancilla that starts in the state $|\phi\rangle$. The combined initial state is $|\Psi\rangle = |\psi\rangle \otimes |\phi\rangle$.

These two systems interact via the Hamiltonian $H = A \otimes B$, which generates the time evolutions $U(t) = \exp[-ixtH]$ (in units where $\hbar = 1$), where $x$ is the "interaction strength", which has units of inverse time. Assume a fixed interaction time $t = \Delta t$ and that $\lambda = x \Delta t$ is small, such that $\lambda^3 \approx 0$.

A series expansion of $U$ in $\lambda$ gives

$$\begin{align}
U &= I \otimes I - i\lambda H - \frac 1 2 \lambda^2 H^2 + O(\lambda^3) \\
&\approx I \otimes I - i\lambda A \otimes B - \frac 1 2 \lambda^2 A^2 \otimes B^2.
\end{align}$$

Because it was only necessary to expand the unitary to a low order in perturbation theory, we call this is a weak interaction. Further, the fact that the unitary is predominately the identity operator, as $\lambda$ and $\lambda^2$ are small, implies that the state after the interaction is not radically different from the initial state. The combined state of the system after interaction is

$$|\Psi'\rangle = \left(I \otimes I - i\lambda A \otimes B - \frac 1 2 \lambda^2 A^2 \otimes B^2\right) |\Psi\rangle.$$

Now we perform a measurement on the ancilla to find out about the system, this is known as an ancilla-coupled measurement. We will consider measurements in a basis $|q\rangle$ (on the ancilla system) such that $\sum_q |q\rangle \langle q| = I$. The measurement's action on both systems is described by the action of the projectors $\Pi_q = I \otimes |q\rangle \langle q|$ on the joint state $|\Psi'\rangle$. From quantum measurement theory we know the conditional state after the measurement is

$$\begin{align}
|\Psi_q\rangle &= \frac{\Pi_q |\Psi'\rangle}{\sqrt{\langle\Psi'| \Pi_q |\Psi'\rangle}} \\
&= \frac{I \langle q|\phi\rangle - i\lambda A \langle q| B |\phi\rangle - \frac 1 2 \lambda^2 A^2 \langle q| B^2 |\phi\rangle}{\mathcal N} |\psi\rangle \otimes |q\rangle,
\end{align}$$

where $\mathcal N = \sqrt{\langle\Psi'| \Pi_q |\Psi'\rangle}$ is a normalization factor for the wavefunction. Notice the ancilla system state records the outcome of the measurement. The object $M_q := I \langle q|\phi\rangle - i\lambda A \langle q| B |\phi\rangle - \frac 1 2 \lambda^2 A^2 \langle q| B^2 |\phi\rangle$ is an operator on the system Hilbert space and is called a Kraus operator.

With respect to the Kraus operators the post-measurement state of the combined system is

$$|\Psi_q\rangle = \frac{M_q |\psi\rangle}{\sqrt{\langle \psi|M_q^\dagger M_q|\psi\rangle}} \otimes |q\rangle.$$

The objects $E_q = M_q^\dagger M_q$ are elements of what is called a POVM and must obey $\sum_q E_q = I$ so that the corresponding probabilities sum to unity: $\sum_q \Pr(q|\psi) = \sum_q \langle\psi| E_q |\psi\rangle = 1$. As the ancilla system is no longer correlated with the primary system, it is simply recording the outcome of the measurement, we can trace over it. Doing so gives the conditional state of the primary system alone:

$$|\psi_q\rangle = \frac{M_q |\psi\rangle}{\sqrt{\langle \psi|M_q^\dagger M_q|\psi\rangle}},$$

which we still label by the outcome of the measurement $q$. Indeed, these considerations allow one to derive a quantum trajectory.

=== Example Kraus operators ===
We will use the canonical example of Gaussian Kraus operators given by Barchielli, Lanz, Prosperi; and Caves and Milburn. Take $H = x \otimes p$, where the position and momentum on both systems have the usual Canonical commutation relation $[x, p] = i$. Take the initial wavefunction of the ancilla to have a Gaussian distribution

$$|\Phi\rangle = \frac{1}{(2\pi\sigma^2)^{1/4}} \int dq' \exp[-q'^2/(4\sigma^2)] |q'\rangle.$$

The position wavefunction of the ancilla is

$$\Phi(q) = \langle q|\Phi\rangle = \frac{1}{(2\pi\sigma^2)^{1/4}} \exp[-q^2/(4\sigma^2)].$$

The Kraus operators are (compared to the discussion above, we set $\lambda = 1$)

$$\begin{align}
M(q) &= \langle q| \exp[-ix \otimes p] |\Phi\rangle \\
&= \frac{1}{(2\pi\sigma^2)^{1/4}} \exp[-(q - x)^2/(4\sigma^2)],
\end{align}$$

while the corresponding POVM elements are

$$\begin{align}
E(q) &= M_q^\dagger M_q \\
&= \frac{1}{\sqrt{2\pi\sigma^2}} \exp[-(q - x)^2/(2\sigma^2)],
\end{align}$$

which obey $\int dq\, E(q) = I$. An alternative representation is often seen in the literature. Using the spectral representation of the position operator $x = \int x'dx' |x'\rangle \langle x'|$, we can write

$$\begin{align}
M(q) &= \frac{1}{(2\pi\sigma^2)^{1/4}} \int dx' \exp[-(q - x')^2/(4\sigma^2)] |x'\rangle \langle x'|, \\
E(q) &= \frac{1}{\sqrt{2\pi\sigma^2}} \int dx' \exp[-(q - x')^2/(2\sigma^2)] |x'\rangle \langle x'|.
\end{align}$$

Notice that $\lim_{\sigma \to 0} E(q) = |x = q\rangle \langle x = q|$. That is, in a particular limit these operators limit to a strong measurement of position; for other values of $\sigma$ we refer to the measurement as finite-strength; and as $\sigma \to \infty$, we say the measurement is weak.

== Information-gain–disturbance tradeoff ==
As stated above, Busch's theorem prevents a free lunch: there can be no information gain without disturbance. However, the tradeoff between information gain and disturbance has been characterized by many authors, including C. A. Fuchs and Asher Peres; Fuchs; Fuchs and K. A. Jacobs; and K. Banaszek.

Recently the information-gain–disturbance tradeoff relation has been examined in the context of what is called the "gentle-measurement lemma".

== Applications ==
Since the early days it has been clear that the primary use of weak measurement would be for feedback control or adaptive measurements of quantum systems. Indeed, this motivated much of Belavkin's work, and an explicit example was given by Caves and Milburn. An early application of an adaptive weak measurements was that of Dolinar receiver, which has been realized experimentally. Another interesting application of weak measurements is to use weak measurements followed by a unitary, possibly conditional on the weak measurement result, to synthesize other generalized measurements. Wiseman and Milburn's book is a good reference for many of the modern developments.
