= Erich Pascal Malkemper =

German neuroscientist (born 1985)

- Born: 24 June 1985 (age 41)
- Education: Ruhr University Bochum (MSc) University of Duisburg-Essen (PhD)
- Awards: Global Young Faculty 2015-2017; Fritz-Frank Award of the German Society for Mammalian Biology (DGS) 2015; Ig Nobel Prize 2014; Studienstiftung 2008-2014; ERC Start Grant 2020
- Scientific career
- Fields: Magnetoreception; Auditory science
- Workplaces: Center of Advanced European Studies and Research
- Doctoral advisors: Hynek Burda
- Other academic advisors: David Keays
- Website: https://www.malkemper-lab.com/Contact/

Erich Pascal Malkemper (born 24 June 1985) is a German neuroscientist. He studies magnetoreception and animal hearing and he is currently a group leader of the Max Planck Society at the Center of Advanced European Studies and Research (CAESAR) in Bonn, Germany.

== Education ==
Malkemper studied neurobiology at the Ruhr University Bochum. He received his MSc degree there in 2011. He received his PhD from the University of Duisburg-Essen in 2014, working with Hynek Burda. His PhD in Duisburg-Essen was followed by a postdoctoral position with David A. Keays at the Research Institute of Molecular Pathology (IMP) in Vienna, Austria.

== Research achievements ==
In 2014 Malkemper showed that woodmice have a radio-frequency dependent magnetic sense. As well in 2014, he received an Ig Nobel Prize for his work on magnetoreception in dogs. Furthermore, he provided support for the absence of magnetite magnetoreceptors in the inner ear. Such receptors had been previously hypothesized at this location, because of the presence of iron rich hair organelles in the inner ear of birds.

In 2020 Malkemper was awarded and ERC Start grant valued at 1.5 million euros to investigate magnetoreception in rodents.
