= Radical-pair mechanism =

Theory in quantum biology

Diagram of the radical-pair mechanism between FAD and tryptophan as applied to avian magnetoreception in the cryptochrome

In quantum biology, the radical-pair mechanism is a proposed spin-chemistry explanation for magnetoreception, the ability for an organism to sense weak magnetic fields. It has been significantly studied in the context of bird migration.

== Mechanism ==
A radical is a molecule with an unpaired valence electron; thus, a pair of radicals is a radical pair. In the radical-pair mechanism, the unpaired electrons of the radical pair are spin-correlated, oscillating (more precisely, undergoing quantum beats) between a singlet state where the spins of the two electrons are antiparallel and a triplet state where they are parallel. This oscillation is generally in the MHz to GHz frequency range. The radical pair spin correlation state can interact with its environment via the Zeeman and hyperfine interactions, particularly with external magnetic fields, which influence the extent and timing of the state oscillation, and consequently the probability that any given pair of radicals will chemically react to form the singlet product (the product produced by the reaction when the pair is in a singlet state) or the triplet product (vice versa). As this probability changes over the whole system, the proportions of the singlet and triplet products change proportionally.

When a static magnetic field, or an oscillating magnetic field with a frequency significantly below 1 MHz (as 1 μs is roughly the lifetime of a radical pair), is applied to a radical pair, transitions between the singlet and triplet state are dominated by the hyperfine interaction below roughly 100 mT and by the Zeeman interaction above this value. Higher-frequency magnetic field oscillations show peaks at the Larmor frequency with strong magnetic fields and at the energy difference between the highest and lowest spin states with weak magnetic fields. The radical-pair mechanism can be amplified by the presence of paramagnetic species reacting with one of the radicals, or by autocatalysis caused by the oscillation of the radical pair.

== Biological impacts ==
=== Avian magnetoreception ===
Flavin-tryptophan radical pairs with millisecond lifetimes created by photochemical processes in cryptochromes have been shown to exhibit sensitivity to static magnetic fields due to the radical-pair mechanism. These cryptochromes are the primary proteins involved in avian magnetoreception.

=== Human brain interactions ===
The radical-pair mechanism is thought to play a role in the use of xenon as an anaesthetic due to observed electron-spin resonance signals. Xenon interacts with tryptophan, which forms a radical pair and can subsequently interact with NMDA receptors. Radical-pair models have similarly been applied to the use of lithium salts as mood stabilizers or impactors of the circadian clock, as well as to the effects of hypomagnetic fields (i.e. magnetic fields with less intensity than the Earth's magnetic field) on the attenuation of neurogenesis in adults; all of these models have been proposed to involve radical pairs of FADH and oxygen.

=== Photosynthesis ===
In the electron transport chain of photosystem II in a chloroplast, the radical-pair mechanism in a P^{+}-H^{-} radical pair is modulated by the spin of Fe^{2+} ions positioned between the two ubiquinones to minmize the production of singlet oxygen, which causes damage to the cell.

== Discovery ==
The radical-pair mechanism was first described in the late 1960s to explain the phenomena of chemically-induced dynamic electron polarization (CIDEP) and chemically-induced dynamic nuclear polarization (CIDNP): that is, anomalously large electron spin resonance and nuclear magnetic resonance signal values, respectively, in organic-molecule chemical reactions. It was first applied to a theory of avian magnetoreception in the 1970s by Schulten et al.

== See also ==
- Chemically-induced dynamic nuclear polarization
