= Magnetobiology =

Study of biological effects of magnetic fields

Magnetobiology is the study of biological effects of mainly weak static and low-frequency magnetic fields, which do not cause heating of tissues. Magnetobiological effects have unique features that obviously distinguish them from thermal effects; often they are observed for alternating magnetic fields just in separate frequency and amplitude intervals. Also, they are dependent of simultaneously present static magnetic or electric fields and their polarization.

Magnetobiology is a subset of bioelectromagnetics. Bioelectromagnetism and biomagnetism are the study of the production of electromagnetic and magnetic fields by biological organisms. The sensing of magnetic fields by organisms is known as magnetoreception.

Biological effects of weak low frequency magnetic fields, less than about 0.1 millitesla (or 1 Gauss) and 100 Hz correspondingly, constitutes a physics problem. The effects look paradoxical, for the energy quantum of these electromagnetic fields is by many orders of value less than the energy scale of an elementary chemical act. On the other hand, the field intensity is not enough to cause any appreciable heating of biological tissues or irritate nerves by the induced electric currents.

== Effects ==
An example of a magnetobiological effect is the magnetic navigation by migrant animals by means of magnetoreception. Many animal orders, such as certain birds, marine turtles, reptiles, amphibians and salmonoid fishes are able to detect small variations of the geomagnetic field and its magnetic inclination to find their seasonal habitats. They are said to use an "inclination compass". Certain crustaceans, spiny lobsters, bony fish, insects and mammals have been found to use a "polarity compass", whereas in snails and cartilageous fish the type of compass is as yet unknown. Little is known about other vertebrates and arthropods. Their perception can be on the order of tens of nanoteslas.

Magnetic intensity as a component of the navigational 'map' of pigeons had been discussed since the late nineteenth century. One of the earliest publications to prove that birds use magnetic information was a 1972 study on the compass of European robins by Wolfgang Wiltschko. A 2014 double blinded study showed that European robins exposed to low level electromagnetic noise between about 20 kHz and 20 MHz, could not orient themselves with their magnetic compass. When they entered aluminium-screened huts, which attenuated electromagnetic noise in the frequency range from 50 kHz to 5 MHz by approximately two orders of magnitude, their orientation reappeared.

For human health effects see electromagnetic radiation and health.

== Magnetoreception ==
Several neurobiological models on the primary process which mediates the magnetic input have been proposed:

1. radical pair mechanism: direction-specific interactions of radical pairs with the ambient magnetic field.
2. processes involving permanently magnetic (iron-bearing) material like magnetite in tissues
3. Magnetically induced changes in physical/chemical properties of liquid water.

In the radical pair mechanism photopigments absorb a photon, which elevates it to the singlet state. They form singlet radical pairs with antiparallel spin, which, by singlet–triplet interconversion, may turn into triplet pairs with parallel spin. Because the magnetic field alters the transition between spin state the amount of triplets depends on how the photopigment is aligned within the magnetic field. Cryptochromes, a class of photopigments known from plants and animals appear to be the receptor molecules.

The induction model would only apply to marine animals because as a surrounding medium with high conductivity only salt water is feasible. Evidence for this model has been lacking.

The magnetite model arose with the discovery of chains of single domain magnetite in certain bacteria in the 1970s. Histological evidence in a large number of species belonging to all major phyla. Honey bees have magnetic material in the front part of the abdomen while in vertebrates mostly in the ethmoid region of the head. Experiments prove that the input from magnetite-based receptors in birds and fish is sent over the ophthalmic branch of the trigeminal nerve to the central nervous system.

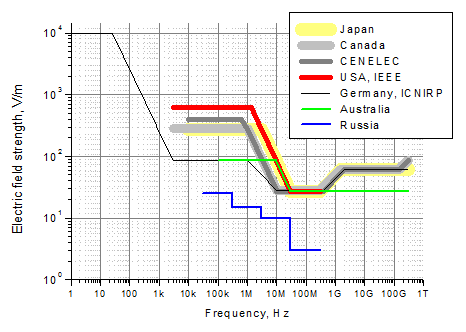
Safe levels of the EM exposures developed by different national and international institutions.

== Safety standards ==
Practical significance of magnetobiology is conditioned by the growing level of the background electromagnetic exposure of people. Some electromagnetic fields at chronic exposures may pose a threat to human health. World Health Organization considers enhanced level of electromagnetic exposure at working places as a stress factor. Present electromagnetic safety standards, worked out by many national and international institutions, differ by tens and hundreds of times for certain EMF ranges; this situation reflects the lack of research in the area of magnetobiology and electromagnetobiology. Today, most of the standards take into account biological effects just from heating by electromagnetic fields, and peripheral nerve stimulation from induced currents.

== Medical approach ==
Practitioners of magnet therapy attempt to treat pain or other medical conditions by relatively weak electromagnetic fields. These methods have not yet received clinical evidence in accordance with accepted standards of evidence-based medicine. Most institutions recognize the practice as a pseudoscientific one.

== See also ==
- Bioelectrochemistry
- Magnetoelectrochemistry
- Electromagnetic radiation and health
- Transcranial magnetic stimulation
- Quantum biology § Magnetoreception
