= David Keays =

Australian neuroscientist (b. 1976)

- David Anthony Keays
- Born: 15 March 1976 (age 50)
- Education: University of Queensland (BSc) University of Melbourne (Hons) University of Oxford (DPhil)
- Scientific career
- Fields: Magnetoreception; Neurodevelopment
- Workplaces: IMP (Vienna)
- Doctoral advisors: Jonathan Flint; Kay Davies; Nick Rawlins
- Website: http://keayslab.org

David Anthony Keays (born 15 March 1976) is an Australian neuroscientist who studies magnetoreception and neurodevelopment. He is currently Chair of Organismal and Developmental Neurobiology at LMU Munich and an adjunct group leader at the Research Institute of Molecular Pathology (IMP) in Vienna, Austria.

== Education ==
Keays studied Science and Law at the University of Queensland, graduating with a BSc majoring in neuroscience and LLB (Hons) in 1998. He received his honours degree in science from the University of Melbourne in 2001 with a thesis describing the isolation and discovery of a novel conotoxin with analgesic activity from the cone shell Conus victoriae. He practiced law as a criminal prosecutor with the Office of Public Prosecutions (OPP) and was admitted to the Supreme Court of Victoria as a Barrister and Solicitor in 2002.

== Career and research ==
In 2002, Keays was appointed as Christopher Welch Scholar by the University of Oxford and joined the lab of Jonathan Flint at the Wellcome Trust Centre for Human Genetics to conduct research for a DPhil degree. During his degree he identified an ENU-induced mutation of α-1 tubulin that resulted in abnormal hippocampal layering in mice. He went on to show that mutations in the human homolog (TUBA1A), cause cortical brain malformations in humans. He was awarded a DPhil in 2006 and became a Wellcome Trust OXION research fellow at St Anne's College, Oxford to continue his research on the molecular processes that drive neuronal migration during neuronal development.

When Keays started his own research group at the IMP in Vienna as an Independent Fellow in 2008, he decided to start a second research branch, investigating the molecular, cellular and neuroanatomical basis of magnetoreception. Using the pigeon as their model organism, his lab was able to show that iron-rich structures in the beaks of pigeons were not part of magnetosensitive neurons but iron deposits in macrophages. His work has continued to challenge the magnetite-based theory of magnetoreception, but advanced electromagnetic induction as an alternative mechanism that allows animals to detect magnetic fields. He has identified a highly sensitive electroceptor (CaV1.3) within the pigeon inner ear, that would enable the detection of minute electric currents generated by movement through the Earth's magnetic field. Most recently the Keays Lab employed whole brain imaging coupled with the analysis of immediate early genes to define the neuronal circuits that process magnetic information. This study provided further evidence supporting the vestibular system in the detection of magnetic stimuli.

In parallel Keays has continued his research on the microtubule cytoskeleton and neurodevelopment. Employing mice and cerebral organoids as model systems his laboratory has shown that mutations in the beta tubulin TUBB5 cause microcephaly, that variants in the microtubule associated protein MAST1 result in mega corpus callosum syndrome, and that mutations in PIK3r4 are associated with neurodevelopmental disorders.

Awards and Honours

Keays has been awarded the Amgen Australian Award in Biotechnology (2000), the Verne Chapman Young Investigator Award (2004), the Peter Beaconsfield Prize in Biosciences (2014), an EMBO Young Investigator (YIP) Award (2013), and the Otto Loewi Prize in Neuroscience (2015). In addition Keays has received a FWF START Award and an ERC Starting Grant in 2014, as well as an ERC Consolidator grant in 2019. In 2014 Keays was admitted to the Austrian Academy of Sciences as a Young Member.

== Media coverage ==
David Attenborough refers to research findings from the Keays lab in Natural Curiosities Episode 2, Series 4 and the group's work has been featured in articles in the Economist, the New Yorker, BBC Radio 4, as well as NBC News and ABC Australia.
