= Magnetic navigation =

Magnetic navigation can be performed using:

- Compass (by humans)
- Magnetoreception (by certain animals)
