= Quantum biology =

Application of quantum mechanics and chemistry to biology

Quantum biology is the study of applications of quantum mechanics and theoretical chemistry to aspects of biology that cannot be accurately described by the classical laws of physics. An understanding of fundamental quantum interactions is important because they determine the properties of the next level of organization in biological systems.

Many biological processes involve the conversion of energy into forms that are usable for chemical transformations, and are quantum mechanical in nature. Such processes involve chemical reactions, light absorption, formation of excited electronic states, transfer of excitation energy, and the transfer of electrons and protons (hydrogen ions) in chemical processes, such as photosynthesis, visual perception, olfaction, and cellular respiration. Moreover, quantum biology may use computations to model biological interactions in light of quantum mechanical effects. Quantum biology is concerned with the influence of non-trivial quantum phenomena, which can be explained by applying the biological process to fundamental physics.

== History ==
Quantum biology is an emerging field, in the sense that most current research is theoretical and subject to questions that require further experimentation. Though the field has only recently received an influx of attention, it has been conceptualized by physicists throughout the 20th century. It has been suggested that quantum biology might play a critical role in the future of the medical world. Early pioneers of quantum physics saw applications of quantum mechanics in biological problems. Erwin Schrödinger's 1944 book What Is Life? discussed applications of quantum mechanics in biology. Schrödinger introduced the idea of an "aperiodic crystal" that contained genetic information in its configuration of covalent chemical bonds. He further suggested that mutations are introduced by "quantum leaps". Other pioneers Niels Bohr, Pascual Jordan, and Max Delbrück argued that the quantum idea of complementarity was fundamental to the life sciences. In 1963, Per-Olov Löwdin published proton tunneling as another mechanism for DNA mutation. In his paper, he stated that there is a new field of study called "quantum biology". In 1979, the Soviet and Ukrainian physicist Alexander Davydov published the first textbook on quantum biology entitled Biology and Quantum Mechanics.

== Enzyme catalysis ==
Enzymes have been postulated to use quantum tunneling to transfer electrons in electron transport chains. It is possible that protein quaternary architectures may have adapted to enable sustained quantum entanglement and coherence, which are two of the limiting factors for quantum tunneling in biological entities. These architectures might account for a greater percentage of quantum energy transfer, which occurs through electron transport and proton tunneling (usually in the form of hydrogen ions, H^{+}). Tunneling refers to the ability of a subatomic particle to travel through potential energy barriers. This ability is due, in part, to the principle of complementarity, which holds that certain substances have pairs of properties that cannot be measured separately without changing the outcome of measurement. Particles, such as electrons and protons, have wave-particle duality; they can pass through energy barriers due to their wave characteristics without violating the laws of physics. In order to quantify how quantum tunneling is used in many enzymatic activities, many biophysicists utilize the observation of hydrogen ions. When hydrogen ions are transferred, this is seen as a staple in an organelle's primary energy processing network; in other words, quantum effects are most usually at work in proton distribution sites at distances on the order of an angstrom (1 Å). In physics, a semiclassical (SC) approach is most useful in defining this process because of the transfer from quantum elements (e.g. particles) to macroscopic phenomena (e.g. biochemicals). Aside from hydrogen tunneling, studies also show that electron transfer between redox centers through quantum tunneling plays an important role in enzymatic activity of photosynthesis and cellular respiration (see also Mitochondria section below).

=== Ferritin ===
Ferritin is an iron storage protein that is found in plants and animals. It is usually formed from 24 subunits that self-assemble into a spherical shell that is approximately 2 nm thick, with an outer diameter that varies with iron loading up to about 16 nm. Up to ~4500 iron atoms can be stored inside the core of the shell in the Fe3+ oxidation state as water-insoluble compounds such as ferrihydrite and magnetite. Ferritin is able to store electrons for at least several hours, which reduce the Fe3+ to water soluble Fe2+. Electron tunneling as the mechanism by which electrons transit the 2 nm thick protein shell was proposed as early as 1988. Electron tunneling and other quantum mechanical properties of ferritin were observed in 1992, and electron tunneling at room temperature and ambient conditions was observed in 2005. Electron tunneling associated with ferritin is a quantum biological process, and ferritin is a quantum biological agent.

Electron tunneling through ferritin between electrodes is independent of temperature, which indicates that it is substantially coherent and activation-less. The electron tunneling distance is a function of the size of the ferritin. Single electron tunneling events can occur over distances of up to 8 nm through the ferritin, and sequential electron tunneling can occur up to 12 nm through the ferritin. It has been proposed that the electron tunneling is magnon-assisted and associated with magnetite microdomains in the ferritin core.

Early evidence of quantum mechanical properties exhibited by ferritin in vivo was reported in 2004, where increased magnetic ordering of ferritin structures in placental macrophages was observed using small angle neutron scattering (SANS). Quantum dot solids also show increased magnetic ordering in SANS testing, and can conduct electrons over long distances. Increased magnetic ordering of ferritin cores disposed in an ordered layer on a silicon substrate with SANS testing has also been observed. Ferritin structures like those in placental macrophages have been tested in solid state configurations and exhibit quantum dot solid-like properties of conducting electrons over distances of up to 80 microns through sequential tunneling and formation of Coulomb blockades. Electron transport through ferritin in placental macrophages may be associated with an anti-inflammatory function.

Conductive atomic force microscopy of substantia nigra pars compacta (SNc) tissue demonstrated evidence of electron tunneling between ferritin cores, in structures that correlate to layers of ferritin outside of neuromelanin organelles.

Evidence of ferritin layers in cell bodies of large dopamine neurons of the SNc and between those cell bodies in glial cells has also been found, and is hypothesized to be associated with neuron function. Overexpression of ferritin reduces the accumulation of reactive oxygen species, and may act as a catalyst by increasing the ability of electrons from antioxidants to neutralize reactive oxygen species through electron tunneling. Ferritin has also been observed in ordered configurations in lysosomes associated with erythropoiesis, where it may be associated with red blood cell production. Direct evidence of tunneling associated with ferritin in vivo in live cells has been obtained from deep brain stimulation tests. It may also be possible to obtain evidence of electron transport associated with ferritin using quantum dots tagged with anti-ferritin, which should emit photons if electrons stored in the ferritin core tunnel to the quantum dots.

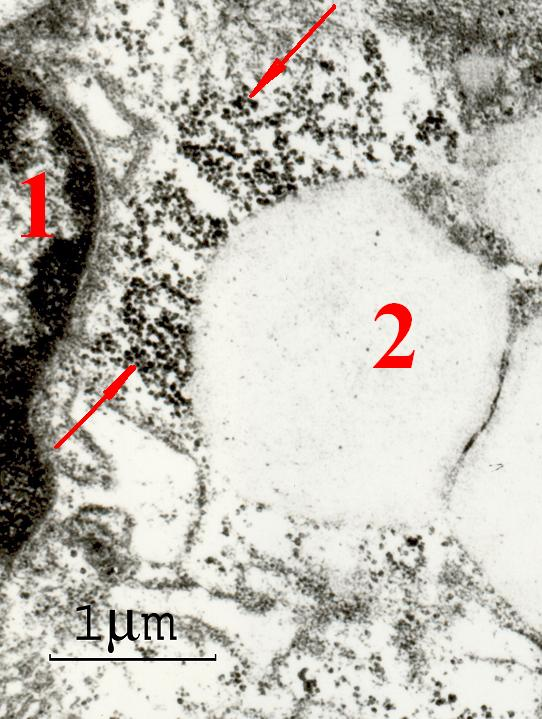
Electron microscope image of placental macrophage ferritin

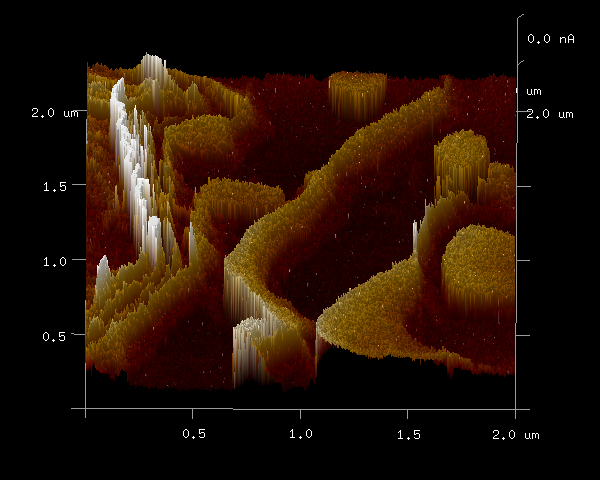
Conductive atomic force microscopy image of human substantia nigra pars compacta (SNc) tissue

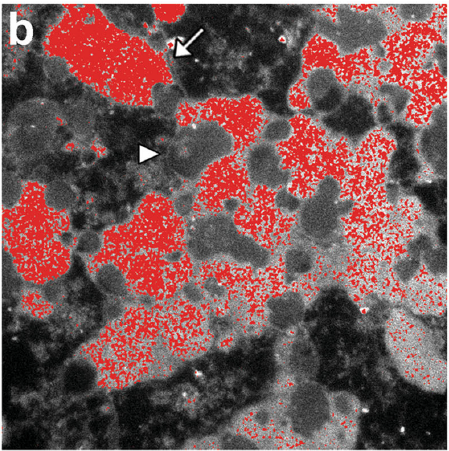
Electron spectroscopic imaging of iron (red) outside of neuromelanin organelles

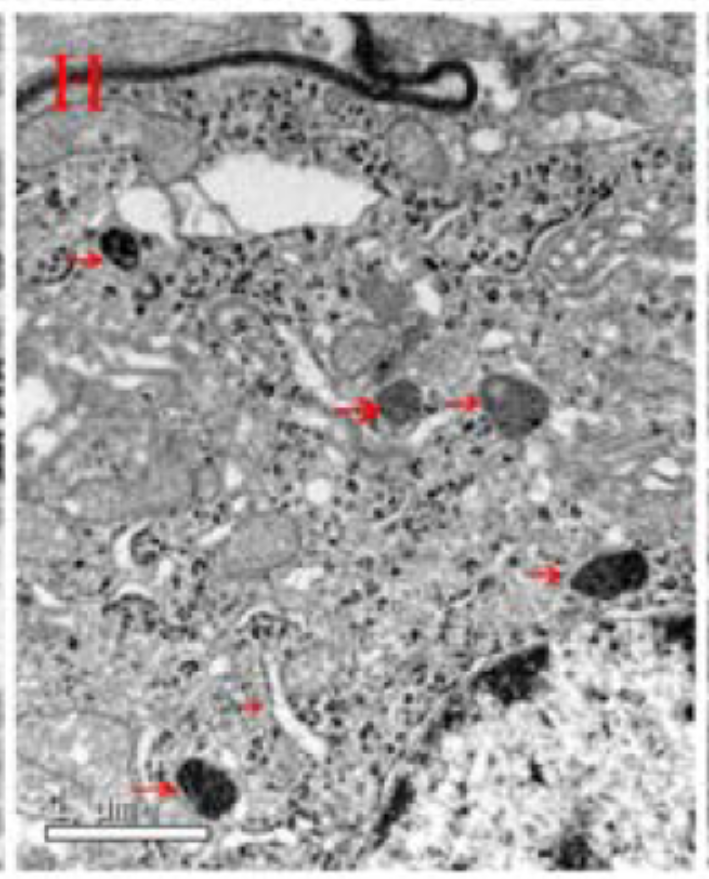
Electron microscope image of glial cell from SNc showing structures similar to ferritin in placental tissue

== Sensory processes ==
=== Olfaction ===
Olfaction, the sense of smell, can be broken down into two parts; the reception and detection of a chemical, and how that detection is sent to and processed by the brain. This process of detecting an odorant is still under question. One theory named the "shape theory of olfaction" suggests that certain olfactory receptors are triggered by certain shapes of chemicals and those receptors send a specific message to the brain. Another theory (based on quantum phenomena) suggests that the olfactory receptors detect the vibration of the molecules that reach them and the "smell" is due to different vibrational frequencies, this theory is aptly called the "vibration theory of olfaction."

The vibration theory of olfaction, created in 1938 by Malcolm Dyson but reinvigorated by Luca Turin in 1996, proposes that the mechanism for the sense of smell is due to G-protein receptors that detect molecular vibrations due to inelastic electron tunneling, tunneling where the electron loses energy, across molecules. In this process a molecule would fill a binding site with a G-protein receptor. After the binding of the chemical to the receptor, the chemical would then act as a bridge allowing for the electron to be transferred through the protein. As the electron transfers across what would otherwise have been a barrier, it loses energy due to the vibration of the newly-bound molecule to the receptor. This results in the ability to smell the molecule.

While the vibration theory has some experimental proof of concept, there have been multiple controversial results in experiments. In some experiments, animals are able to distinguish smells between molecules of different frequencies and same structure, while other experiments show that people are unaware of distinguishing smells due to distinct molecular frequencies.

=== Vision ===
Vision relies on quantized energy in order to convert light signals to an action potential in a process called phototransduction. In phototransduction, a photon interacts with a chromophore in a light receptor. The chromophore absorbs the photon and undergoes photoisomerization. This change in structure induces a change in the structure of the photo receptor and resulting signal transduction pathways lead to a visual signal. However, the photoisomerization reaction occurs at a rapid rate, in under 200 femtoseconds, with high yield. Models suggest the use of quantum effects in shaping the ground state and excited state potentials in order to achieve this efficiency.

The sensor in the retina of the human eye is sensitive enough to detect a single photon. Single photon detection could lead to multiple different technologies. One area of development is in quantum communication and cryptography. The idea is to use a biometric system to measure the eye using only a small number of points across the retina with random flashes of photons that "read" the retina and identify the individual. This biometric system would only allow a certain individual with a specific retinal map to decode the message. This message can not be decoded by anyone else unless the eavesdropper were to guess the proper map or could read the retina of the intended recipient of the message.

Theoretical and mathematical evidence of an underlying quantum structure in human color perception has been presented by Michel Berthier and Edoardo Provenzi in a series of scientific articles. Notably, in their quantum formalism, the chromatic opposition phenomena proposed by Hering emerge naturally. Uncertainty principles for the perception of opposition have been predicted within this framework, which has so far demonstrated concrete applications in the removal of color cast in natural images caused by the presence of a non-neutral illuminant.

== Energy transfer ==
=== Photosynthesis ===
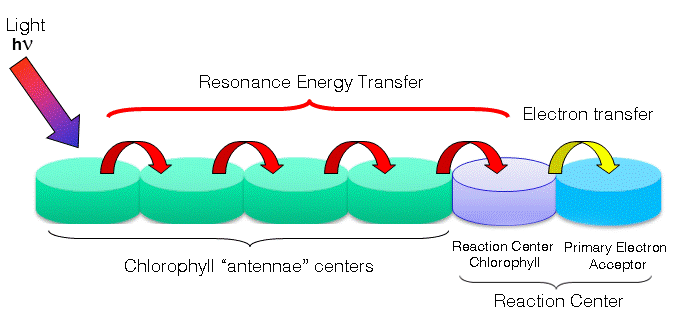
Generic photosystem Complex

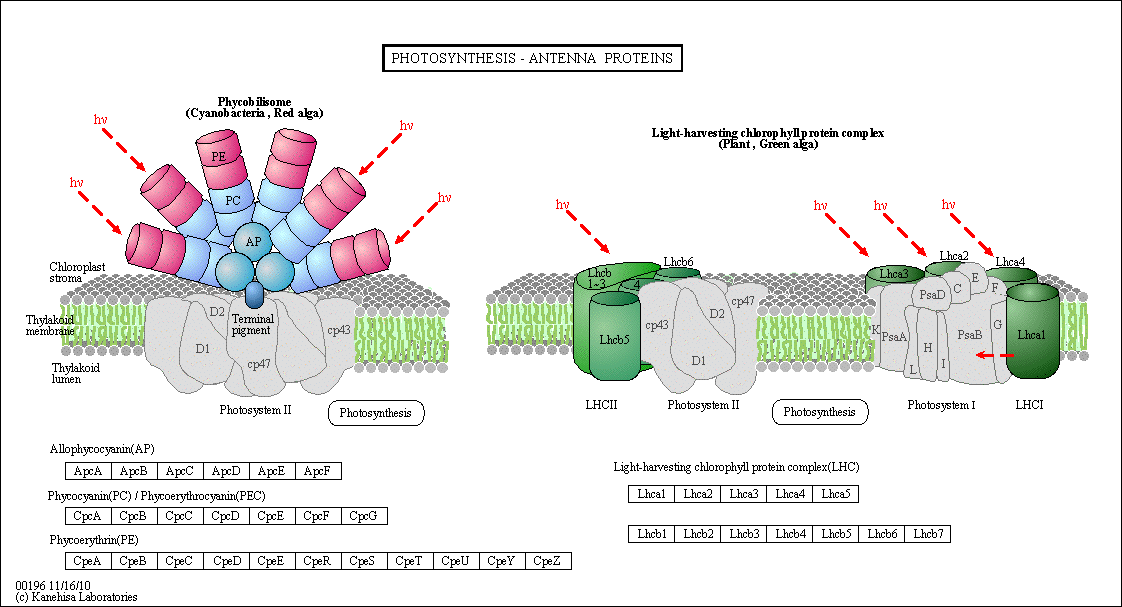
Antennae complex found in photosystems of both prokaryotes and eukaryotes

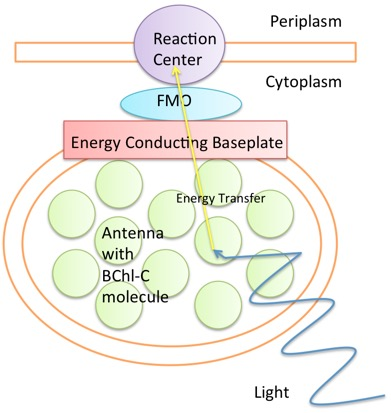
Diagram of FMO complex. Light excites electrons in an antenna. The excitation then transfers through various proteins in the FMO complex to the reaction center to further photosynthesis.

Photosynthesis refers to the biological process that photosynthetic cells use to synthesize organic compounds from inorganic starting materials using sunlight. What has been primarily implicated as exhibiting non-trivial quantum behaviors is the light reaction stage of photosynthesis. In this stage, photons are absorbed by the membrane-bound photosystems. Photosystems contain two major domains, the light-harvesting complex (antennae) and the reaction center. These antennae vary among organisms. For example, bacteria use circular aggregates of chlorophyll pigments, while plants use membrane-embedded protein and chlorophyll complexes. Regardless, photons are first captured by the antennae and passed on to the reaction-center complex. Various pigment-protein complexes, such as the FMO complex in green sulfur bacteria, are responsible for transferring energy from antennae to reaction site. The photon-driven excitation of the reaction-center complex mediates the oxidation and the reduction of the primary electron acceptor, a component of the reaction-center complex. Much like the electron transport chain of the mitochondria, a linear series of oxidations and reductions drives proton (H+) pumping across the thylakoid membrane, the development of a proton motive force, and energetic coupling to the synthesis of ATP.

Previous understandings of electron-excitation transference (EET) from light-harvesting antennae to the reaction center have relied on the Förster theory of incoherent EET, postulating weak electron coupling between chromophores and incoherent hopping from one to another. This theory has largely been disproven by FT electron spectroscopy experiments that show electron absorption and transfer with an efficiency of above 99%, which cannot be explained by classical mechanical models. Instead, as early as 1938, scientists theorized that quantum coherence was the mechanism for excitation-energy transfer. Indeed, the structure and nature of the photosystem places it in the quantum realm, with EET ranging from the femto- to nanosecond scale, covering sub-nanometer to nanometer distances. The effects of quantum coherence on EET in photosynthesis are best understood through state and process coherence. State coherence refers to the extent of individual superpositions of ground and excited states for quantum entities, such as excitons. Process coherence, on the other hand, refers to the degree of coupling between multiple quantum entities and their evolution as either dominated by unitary or dissipative parts, which compete with one another. Both of these types of coherence are implicated in photosynthetic EET, where an exciton is coherently delocalized over several chromophores. This delocalization allows for the system to simultaneously explore several energy paths and use constructive and destructive interference to guide the path of the exciton's wave packet. It is presumed that natural selection has favored the most efficient path to the reaction center. Experimentally, the interaction between the different frequency wave packets, made possible by long-lived coherence, will produce quantum beats.

While quantum photosynthesis is still an emerging field, there have been many experimental results that support the quantum-coherence understanding of photosynthetic EET. A 2007 study claimed the identification of electronic quantum coherence at −196 °C (77 K). Another theoretical study from 2010 provided evidence that quantum coherence lives as long as 300 femtoseconds at biologically relevant temperatures (4 °C or 277 K). In that same year, experiments conducted on photosynthetic cryptophyte algae using two-dimensional photon echo spectroscopy yielded further confirmation for long-term quantum coherence. These studies suggest that, through evolution, nature has developed a way of protecting quantum coherence to enhance the efficiency of photosynthesis. However, critical follow-up studies question the interpretation of these results. Single-molecule spectroscopy now shows the quantum characteristics of photosynthesis without the interference of static disorder, and some studies use this method to assign reported signatures of electronic quantum coherence to nuclear dynamics occurring in chromophores. A number of proposals emerged to explain unexpectedly long coherence. According to one proposal, if each site within the complex feels its own environmental noise, the electron will not remain in any local minimum due to both quantum coherence and its thermal environment, but proceed to the reaction site via quantum walks. Another proposal is that the rate of quantum coherence and electron tunneling create an energy sink that moves the electron to the reaction site quickly. Other work suggested that geometric symmetries in the complex may favor efficient energy transfer to the reaction center, mirroring perfect state transfer in quantum networks. Furthermore, experiments with artificial dye molecules cast doubts on the interpretation that quantum effects last any longer than one hundred femtoseconds.

In 2017, the first control experiment with the original FMO protein under ambient conditions confirmed that electronic quantum effects are washed out within 60 femtoseconds, while the overall exciton transfer takes a time on the order of a few picoseconds. In 2020 a review based on a wide collection of control experiments and theory concluded that the proposed quantum effects as long lived electronic coherences in the FMO system does not hold. Instead, research investigating transport dynamics suggests that interactions between electronic and vibrational modes of excitation in FMO complexes require a semi-classical, semi-quantum explanation for the transfer of exciton energy. In other words, while quantum coherence dominates in the short-term, a classical description is most accurate to describe long-term behavior of the excitons.

Another process in photosynthesis that has almost 100% efficiency is charge transfer, again suggesting that quantum mechanical phenomena are at play. In 1966, a study on the photosynthetic bacterium Chromatium found that at temperatures below 100 K, cytochrome oxidation is temperature-independent, slow (on the order of milliseconds), and very low in activation energy. The authors, Don DeVault and Britton Chase, postulated that these characteristics of electron transfer are indicative of quantum tunneling, whereby electrons penetrate a potential barrier despite possessing less energy than is classically necessary.

=== Mitochondria ===
Mitochondria have been demonstrated to utilize quantum tunneling in their function as the powerhouse of eukaryotic cells. Similar to the light reactions in the thylakoid, linearly-associated membrane-bound proteins comprising the electron transport chain (ETC) energetically link the reduction of O2 with the development of a proton motive gradient (H+) across the inner membrane of the mitochondria. This energy stored as a proton motive gradient is then coupled with the synthesis of ATP. It is significant that the mitochondrion conversion of biomass into chemical ATP achieves 60-70% thermodynamic efficiency, far superior to that of man-made engines. This high degree of efficiency is largely attributed to the quantum tunnelling of electrons in the ETC and of protons in the proton motive gradient. Indeed, electron tunneling has already been demonstrated in certain elements of the ETC including NADH:ubiquinone oxidoreductase(Complex I) and CoQH2-cytochrome c reductase (Complex III).

In quantum mechanics, both electrons and protons are quantum entities that exhibit wave-particle duality, exhibiting both particle and wave-like properties depending on the method of experimental observation. Quantum tunneling is a direct consequence of this wave-like nature of quantum entities that permits the passing-through of a potential energy barrier that would otherwise restrict the entity. Moreover, it depends on the shape and size of a potential barrier relative to the incoming energy of a particle. Because the incoming particle is defined by its wave function, its tunneling probability is dependent upon the potential barrier's shape in an exponential way. For example, if the barrier is relatively wide, the incoming particle's probability to tunnel will decrease. The potential barrier, in some sense, can come in the form of an actual biomaterial barrier. The inner mitochondria membrane which houses the various components of the ETC is on the order of 7.5 nm thick. The inner membrane of a mitochondrion must be overcome to permit signals (in the form of electrons, protons, H^{+}) to transfer from the site of emittance (internal to the mitochondria) and the site of acceptance (i.e. the electron transport chain proteins). In order to transfer particles, the membrane of the mitochondria must have the correct density of phospholipids to conduct a relevant charge distribution that attracts the particle in question. For instance, for a greater density of phospholipids, the membrane contributes to a greater conductance of protons.

It is also noted that mitochondrial ferritin is located in the matrix adjacent to the location of the mitochondrial electron transport chain and could be involved in electron transport. It has been observed that magnetic fields can stimulate the mitochondrial electron transport chain, which is consistent ferritin's magnetic properties and ability to buffer electrons.

=== Molecular solitons in proteins ===
Alexander Davydov developed the quantum theory of molecular solitons in order to explain the transport of energy in protein α-helices in general and the physiology of muscle contraction in particular. He showed that the molecular solitons are able to preserve their shape through nonlinear interaction of amide I excitons and phonon deformations inside the lattice of hydrogen-bonded peptide groups. In 1979, Davydov published his complete textbook on quantum biology entitled "Biology and Quantum Mechanics" featuring quantum dynamics of proteins, cell membranes, bioenergetics, muscle contraction, and electron transport in biomolecules.

== Information encoding ==
=== Magnetoreception ===
The radical pair mechanism has been proposed for quantum magnetoreception in birds. It takes place in cryptochrome molecules in cells in the birds' retinas.

Magnetoreception is the ability of animals to navigate using the inclination of the magnetic field of the Earth. A possible explanation for magnetoreception is the entangled radical pair mechanism. The radical-pair mechanism is well-established in spin chemistry, and was speculated to apply to magnetoreception in 1978 by Schulten et al.. The ratio between singlet and triplet pairs is changed by the interaction of entangled electron pairs with the magnetic field of the Earth. In 2000, cryptochrome was proposed as the "magnetic molecule" that could harbor magnetically sensitive radical-pairs. Cryptochrome, a flavoprotein found in the eyes of European robins and other animal species, is the only protein known to form photoinduced radical-pairs in animals. When it interacts with light particles, cryptochrome goes through a redox reaction, which yields radical pairs both during the photo-reduction and the oxidation. The function of cryptochrome is diverse across species, however, the photoinduction of radical-pairs occurs by exposure to blue light, which excites an electron in a chromophore. Magnetoreception is also possible in the dark, so the mechanism must rely more on the radical pairs generated during light-independent oxidation.

Experiments in the lab support the basic theory that radical-pair electrons can be significantly influenced by very weak magnetic fields, i.e., merely the direction of weak magnetic fields can affect radical-pair's reactivity and therefore can "catalyze" the formation of chemical products. Whether this mechanism applies to magnetoreception and/or quantum biology, that is, whether Earth's magnetic field "catalyzes" the formation of biochemical products by the aid of radical-pairs, is not fully clear. Radical-pairs may need not be entangled, the key quantum feature of the radical-pair mechanism, to play a part in these processes. There are entangled and non-entangled radical-pairs, but disturbing only entangled radical-pairs is not possible with current technology. Researchers found evidence for the radical-pair mechanism of magnetoreception when European robins, cockroaches, and garden warblers, could no longer navigate when exposed to a radio frequency that obstructs magnetic fields and radical-pair chemistry. Further evidence came from a comparison of cryptochrome 4 (CRY4) from migrating and non-migrating birds. CRY4 from chicken and pigeon were found to be less sensitive to magnetic fields than those from the (migrating) European robin, suggesting evolutionary optimization of this protein as a sensor of magnetic fields.

In addition to radical pairs, a study found that depleting macrophages in homing pigeons using the drug clodronate impaired the ability of the homing pigeons to navigate in the dark, but not during the day. These observations are consistent with the hypothesized signaling mechanism involving ferritin discussed above, as well as ferritin's observed magnetic properties.

=== DNA mutation ===
DNA acts as the instructions for making proteins throughout the body. It consists of 4 nucleotides: guanine, thymine, cytosine, and adenine. The order of these nucleotides gives the "recipe" for the different proteins.

Whenever a cell reproduces, it must copy these strands of DNA. However, sometime throughout the process of copying the strand of DNA a mutation, or an error in the DNA code, can occur. A theory for the reasoning behind DNA mutation is explained in the Lowdin DNA mutation model. In this model, a nucleotide may spontaneously change its form through a process of quantum tunneling. Because of this, the changed nucleotide will lose its ability to pair with its original base pair and consequently change the structure and order of the DNA strand.

Exposure to ultraviolet light and other types of radiation can cause DNA mutation and damage. The radiation also can modify the bonds along the DNA strand in the pyrimidines and cause them to bond with themselves, creating a dimer.

In many prokaryotes and plants, these bonds are repaired by a DNA-repair-enzyme photolyase. As its prefix implies, photolyase is reliant on light in order to repair the strand. Photolyase works with its cofactor FADH, flavin adenine dinucleotide, while repairing the DNA. Photolyase is excited by visible light and transfers an electron to the cofactor FADH. FADH—now in the possession of an extra electron—transfers the electron to the dimer to break the bond and repair the DNA. The electron tunnels from the FADH to the dimer. Although the range of this tunneling is much larger than feasible in a vacuum, the tunneling in this scenario is said to be "superexchange-mediated tunneling," and is possible due to the protein's ability to boost the tunneling rates of the electron.

== Other ==
Other quantum phenomena in biological systems include the conversion of chemical energy into motion and brownian motors in many cellular processes.

Alongside the multiple strands of scientific inquiry into quantum mechanics has come unconnected pseudoscientific interest; this caused scientists to approach quantum biology cautiously.

Hypotheses such as orchestrated objective reduction which postulate a link between quantum mechanics and consciousness have been controversial in the scientific community with some claiming it to be pseudoscientific.
