= Günter Nimtz =

German physicist

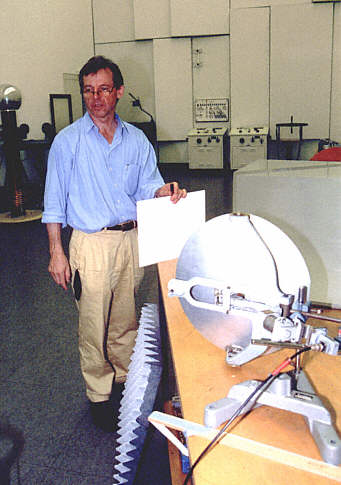
- Nimtz showing elements of his double prism experiment in the labs of the University of Cologne.
- Born: 22 September 1936 (age 90)
- Education: University of Vienna
- Scientific career
- Fields: Physics
- Workplaces: University of Cologne

Günter Nimtz (born 22 September 1936) is a German physicist, working at the 2nd Physics Institute at the University of Cologne in Germany. He has investigated narrow-gap semiconductors and liquid crystals. His claims show that particles may travel faster than the speed of light when undergoing quantum tunneling.

== Academic career ==
Günter Nimtz studied Electrical Engineering in Mannheim and Physics at the University of Heidelberg. He graduated from the University of Vienna and became a professor of physics at the University of Cologne in 1983. During 1977 he was a research associate for teaching and researching at McGill University, Montreal/Canada. He achieved emeritus status in 2001. During 2004 he was Visiting Professor at the University of Shanghai and of the Beijing University of Posts and Telecommunications. From 2001 to 2008 he was teaching and doing fundamental research at the University of Koblenz-Landau.

== Industrial research and development ==
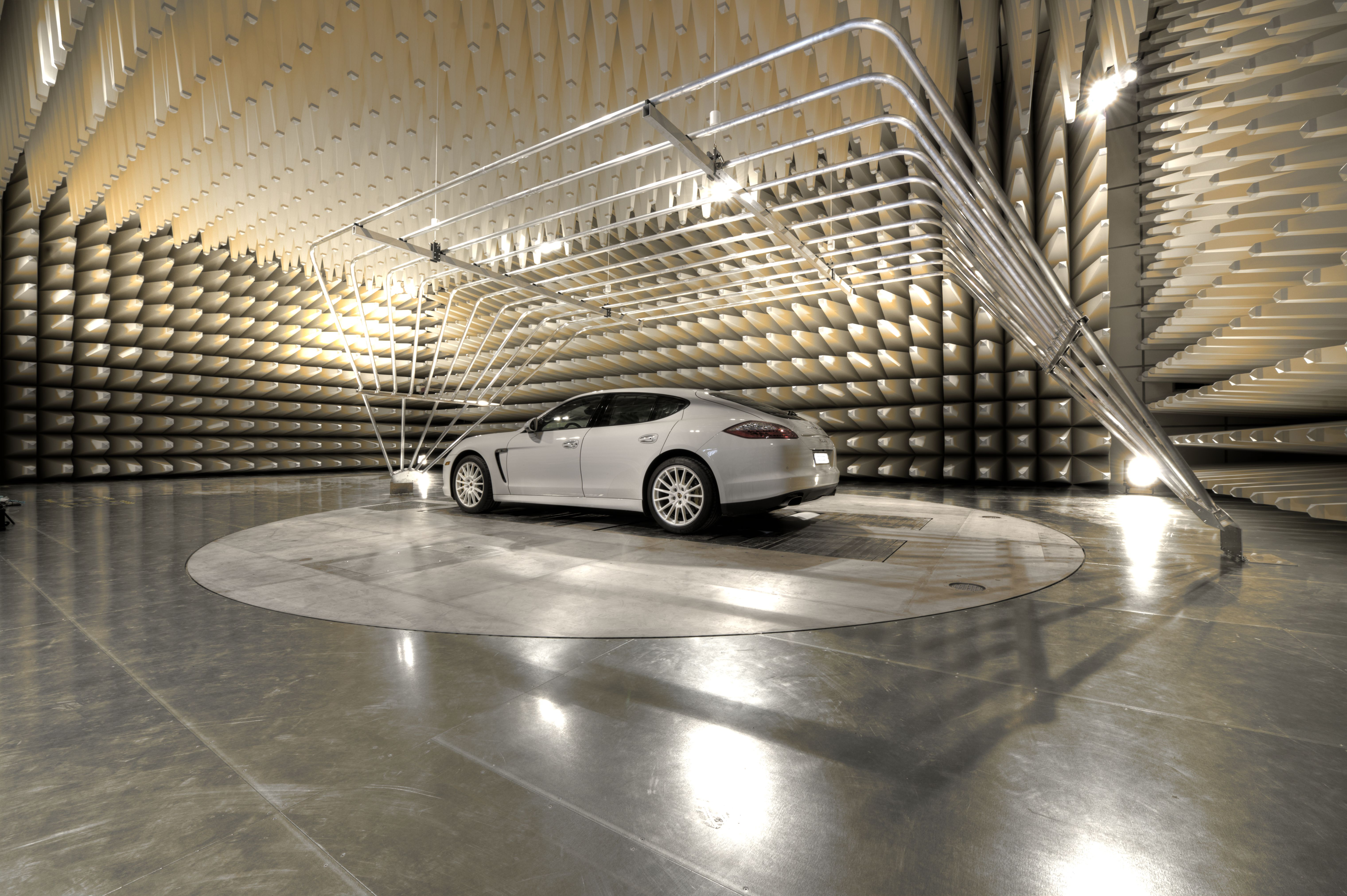
Anechoic electromagnetic chamber with the novel nano-metalfilm pyramidal absorbers on the walls. A Porsche is under an electromagnetic compatibility test.

In 1993 Günter Nimtz and Achim Enders invented a novel absorber for electromagnetic anechoic chambers. It is based on a 10 nanometer -thick metal film placed on an incombustible pyramidal carrier. At the Merck Company in Darmstadt Nimtz designed an apparatus for the production of ceramic aerosols.

== Experiments related to superluminal quantum tunneling ==
Nimtz and his coauthors have been investigating superliminal quantum tunneling since 1992. Their experiment involved microwaves either being sent across two space-separated prisms or through frequency-filtered waveguides. In the latter case either an additional undersized waveguide or a reflective grating structure had been used. In 1994 Nimtz and Horst Aichmann carried out a tunneling experiment at the laboratories of Hewlett-Packard after which Nimtz stated that the frequency modulated (FM) carrier wave transported a signal 4.7 times faster than light due to the effect of quantum tunneling. Recently, this experiment was successfully reproduced by Peter Elsen and Simon Tebeck and represented at "Jugend forscht" the German pupil competition in Physics 2019. They won the first prize of Rheinland-Pfalz and the Heraeus Prize of Germany.

Diagram of the Nimtz and Stahlhofen double prism experiment. Photons can be detected behind the right-hand prism until the gap exceeds up to about one meter. Wavelength was 33 mm.

Alfons Stahlhofen and Nimtz described an experiment which sent a beam of microwaves towards a pair of prisms. The angle provided for total internal reflection and setting up an evanescent wave. Because the second prism was close to the first prism, some light leaked across that gap. The transmitted and reflected waves arrived at detectors at the same time, despite the transmitted light having also traversed the distance of the gap. This is the basis for the assertion of faster-than-c transmission of information.

Nimtz and coworkers asserted that the measured tunneling time is spent at the barrier front, whereas inside the barrier zero time is spent. This result was observed in several tunneling barriers and in various fields. Zero time tunneling was already calculated by several theoreticians, while other mathematical results point at a completely subluminal process when the standard relativistic causality notion is used together with relativistic wave equations for the wavefunction.

== Scientific opponents and their interpretations ==
Chris Lee has stated that there is no new physics involved here, and that the apparent faster-than-c transmission can be explained by carefully considering how the time of arrival is measured (whether the group velocity or some other measure). Recent papers by Herbert Winful point out errors in Nimtz' interpretation. These articles propose that Nimtz has provided a rather trivial experimental confirmation for General Relativity. Winful says that there is nothing specifically quantum-mechanical about Nimtz's experiment, that in fact the results agree with the predictions of classical electromagnetism (Maxwell's equations), and that in one of his papers on tunneling through undersized waveguides Nimtz himself had written "Therefore microwave tunneling, i.e. the propagation of guided evanescent modes, can be described to an extremely high degree of accuracy by a theory based on Maxwell's equations and on phase time approach." (Elsewhere Nimtz has argued that since evanescent modes have an imaginary wave number, they represent a "mathematical analogy" to quantum tunnelling, and that "evanescent modes are not fully describable by the Maxwell equations and quantum mechanics have to be taken into consideration." Since Maxwell's laws respect special relativity, Winful argues that an experiment which is describable using these laws cannot involve a relativistic causality violation (which would be implied by transmitting information faster than light). He also argues that "Nothing was observed to be traveling faster than light. The measured delay is the lifetime of stored energy leaking out of both sides of the barrier. The equality of transmission and reflection delays is what one expects for energy leaking out of both sides of a symmetric barrier."

Aephraim M. Steinberg of the University of Toronto has also stated that Nimtz has not demonstrated causality violation (which would be implied by transmitting information faster than light). Steinberg also uses a classical argument. In a New Scientist article, he uses the analogy of a train traveling from Chicago to New York, but dropping off train cars at each station along the way, so that the center of the train moves forward at each stop; in this way, the speed of the center of the train exceeds the speed of any of the individual cars. Herbert Winful argues that the train analogy is a variant of the "reshaping argument" for superluminal tunneling velocities, but he goes on to say that this argument is not actually supported by experiment or simulations, which actually show that the transmitted pulse has the same length and shape as the incident pulse. Instead, Winful argues that the group delay in tunneling is not actually the transit time for the pulse (whose spatial length must be greater than the barrier length in order for its spectrum to be narrow enough to allow tunneling), but is instead the lifetime of the energy stored in a standing wave which forms inside the barrier. Since the stored energy in the barrier is less than the energy stored in a barrier-free region of the same length due to destructive interference, the group delay for the energy to escape the barrier region is shorter than it would be in free space, which according to Winful is the explanation for apparently superluminal tunneling. This becomes obvious wrong in a standing wave guide set-up at frequencies below the cut-off frequency.

Apart from these strange interpretations further authors have published papers arguing that quantum tunneling does not violate the relativistic notion of causality, and that Nimtz's experiments (which are argued to be purely classical in nature) don't violate it either. Some oppositional theoretical interpretations have been published.

== Nimtz' interpretation ==
In the Physics lab of the University of Koblenz, 2008

Nimtz and others argue that an analysis of signal shape and frequency spectrum has evidenced that a superluminal signal velocity has been measured and that tunneling is the one and only observed violation of special relativity. However – in contradiction to their opponents – they explicitly point out that this does not lead to a violation of primitive causality: Due to the temporal extent of any kind of signal it is impossible to transport information into the past. After all they claim that tunneling can generally be explained with virtual photons, the strange particles introduced by Richard Feynman and shown for evanescent modes by Ali and by Cargnilia and Mandel. In that sense it is common to calculate the imaginary tunneling wave number with the Helmholtz and the Schrödinger equations as Günter Nimtz and Herbert Winful did. However, Nimtz highlights that eventually the final tunneling time was always obtained by the Wigner phase time approach. Günter Nimtz outlines that such evanescent modes only exist in the classically forbidden region of energy. As a consequence they cannot be explained by classical physics nor by special relativity postulates: A negative energy of evanescent modes follows from the imaginary wave number, i.e. from the imaginary refractive index according to the Maxwell relation $n := \sqrt{\epsilon_r\mu_r}$ for electromagnetic and elastic fields. Nimtz explicitly points out that tunneling indeed confronts special relativity and that any other statement must be considered incorrect. All waves have a zero tunneling time. and the barrier can be seen as a timeless macroscopic space. Winfuls tunneling model is not correct. Recently it was proven in several experiments with photonic and Schrödinger wave packets that all waves have a zero tunneling time.

== Related experiments ==
It was later claimed by the Keller group in Switzerland that particle tunneling does indeed occur in zero real time. Their tests involved tunneling electrons, where the group argued a relativistic prediction for tunneling time should be 500–600 attoseconds (an attosecond is one quintillionth of a second). All that could be measured was 24 attoseconds, which is the limit of the test accuracy. Again, though, other physicists believe that tunneling experiments in which particles appear to spend anomalously short times inside the barrier are in fact fully compatible with relativity, although there is disagreement about whether the explanation involves reshaping of the wave packet or other effects.

This claimed zero tunnel time for electrons is in apparent contrast with the known fact that quantum tunneling is a completely subluminal effect (namely, it is consistent with the standard notion of relativistic causality and does not lead to faster-than-light propagation of information) when modeled with the relativistic Dirac equation. Therefore, or the Dirac equation has to be disregarded to model relativistic tunneling, or the interpretation of the experimental results should be made consistent with the standard textbook relativistic causality notion in which the wave function can not propagate beyond its future light-cone envelope.

== Conclusions and future research ==
Nimtz' interpretation is based on the following theory: The expression $1 \over {(hv)^2 - (pc)^2}$ in the Feynman photon propagator means that a photon has the highest probability of traveling exactly at the speed of light $(hv = pc)$, but it has nonvanishing probability to violate the laws of special relativity, as a "virtual photon", over short time and length scales. While it would be impossible to transport information over cosmologically relevant time scales using tunneling (the tunneling probability is simply too small if the classically forbidden region is too large), over short time and length scales, the tunneling photons are allowed to propagate faster than light, in view of their property as virtual particles. The photon propagation probability is nonvanishing even if the photon's angular frequency omega is not equal to the product of the speed of light c and the wave momentum p. Nimtz has written in more detail on signals and the described interpretation of the FTL tunneling experiments.

Although his experimental results have been well documented since the early 1990s, Günter Nimtz' interpretation of the implications of these results represents a highly debated topic, which numerous researchers consider as incorrect (see above, #Scientific opponents and their interpretations). Some oppositional studies on zero time tunneling have been published. The common descriptions of FTL-tunneling signals presented in most textbooks and articles are corrected into final conclusions according to Brillouin and other important physicists.

== Selected works ==
- Stahlhofen, A. A; Nimtz, G (2006). "Evanescent modes are virtual photons". Europhysics Letters. 76 (2). IOP Publishing: 189–195. Bibcode:2006EL.....76..189S. doi:10.1209/epl/i2006-10271-9. ISSN 0295-5075. S2CID 250758644.
- Nimtz, G. (2006). "Do Evanescent Modes Violate Relativistic Causality?". Special Relativity. Lecture Notes in Physics. Vol. 702. Springer Berlin Heidelberg. pp. 506–531. doi:10.1007/3-540-34523-x_19. ISBN 978-3-540-34522-0.
- Aichmann, Horst; Nimtz, Günter (2014). "On the Traversal Time of Barriers". Foundations of Physics. 44 (6): 678–688. Bibcode:2014FoPh...44..678A. doi:10.1007/s10701-014-9804-2. ISSN 0015-9018.
- Nimtz, G., & Aichmann, H. (2015). Zero time tunneling: macroscopic experiments with virtual particles. In EPJ Web of Conferences (Vol. 95, p. 04044). EDP Sciences
- Nimtz, Günter; Aichmann, Horst (27 April 2021). "All waves have a zero tunneling time". Zeitschrift für Naturforschung A. 76 (4): 295–297. Bibcode:2021ZNatA..76..295N. doi:10.1515/zna-2020-0299. ISSN 1865-7109.
- Nimtz, G. "Faster Than Light, Spaces without Time" (in German).
- Nimtz, Günter; Aichmann, Horst (2024). "On time and space in potential barriers". International Journal of Engineering and Science Invention. 13 (11): 17–20. doi:10.35629/6734-13111720.
- Nimtz, Günter; Aichmann, Horst (2025). "Illusion of space and time in 1-dimension" (PDF). International Journal of Engineering and Science Invention. 14 (11). doi:10.35629/6734-14110102 (inactive 9 November 2026).
- Nimtz, Günter; Aichmann, Horst (2026). "What has Entanglement in common with Tunneling?" (PDF). International Journal of Engineering and Science Invention. 15 (1). doi:10.35629/6734-15011920 (inactive 9 November 2026).
