= Cuticulosome =

Anatomical structure in birds

The cuticulosome is a spherical, iron-rich structure located in the cuticular plate of auditory and vestibular hair cells in birds. Cuticulosomes are 300-600 nm in diameter and are composed of ferritin-like granules that in some cases are structured in paracrystalline arrays. Due to its specific location in sensory hair cells of the inner ear and its iron-rich composition it was proposed to be involved in the magnetic sense of birds. However, physical simulations and calculations showed that it lacks sufficient magnetic susceptibility to act as a torque based magnetoreceptor. An alternative hypothesis suggests that the cuticulosome might work as an intracellular electromagnetic oscillator to detect magnetic fields.
