= Jonathan Flint (scientist) =

British behavior geneticist

Jonathan Flint FRS
- Education: St Mary's Hospital, London
- Scientific career
- Fields: Behavioural genetics Major depressive disorder
- Workplaces: University of California, Los Angeles; University of Oxford; Wellcome Centre for Human Genetics
- Website: www.semel.ucla.edu/profile/jonathan-flint

Jonathan Flint is a British behavior geneticist and Professor in Residence in the Department of Psychiatry and Biobehavioral Sciences at the David Geffen School of Medicine at UCLA. He is also a senior scientist in the Center for Neurobehavioral Genetics at UCLA's Semel Institute for Neuroscience and Human Behavior.

== Career and research ==
Flint is known for his research on the genetics of complex traits in mice and major depressive disorder in humans. In 2015, he and his colleagues published a study that was the first to link two genetic variants to this disorder. In 2016, he left his post as director of the Psychiatric Genetics Group at the University of Oxford's Wellcome Trust Centre for Human Genetics to join UCLA. Upon doing so, he became one of four directors of UCLA's Depression Grand Challenge, which aims to conduct a study of 100,000 people to search for genetic risk factors for depression. This study is intended to be the largest genetic study of a disorder ever conducted in humans. He serves on the editorial board for the journal Current Biology.

=== Awards and honours ===
Flint was elected a Fellow of the Academy of Medical Sciences in 2005. He received The Genetics Society's Medal in 2014. He was elected a Fellow of the Royal Society (FRS) in 2019.
