= Proton tunneling =

Quantum mechanical phenomenon

Proton tunneling is a type of quantum tunneling involving the instantaneous disappearance of a proton in one site and the appearance of the same proton at an adjacent site separated by a potential barrier. The two available sites are bounded by a double well potential of which its shape, width and height are determined by a set of boundary conditions. According to the WKB approximation, the probability for a particle to tunnel is inversely proportional to its mass and the width of the potential barrier. Electron tunneling is well-known. A proton is about 2000 times more massive than an electron, so it has a much lower probability of tunneling; nevertheless, proton tunneling still occurs especially at low temperatures and high pressures where the width of the potential barrier is decreased.

Proton tunneling is usually associated with hydrogen bonds. In many molecules that contain hydrogen, the hydrogen atoms are linked to two non-hydrogen atoms via a hydrogen bond at one end and a covalent bond at the other. A hydrogen atom without its electron is reduced to being a proton. Since the electron is no longer bound to the hydrogen atom in a hydrogen bond, this is equivalent to a proton resting in one of the wells of a double well potential as described above. When proton tunneling occurs, the hydrogen bond and covalent bonds are switched. Once proton tunneling occurs, the same proton has the same probability of tunneling back to its original site provided the double well potential is symmetrical.

The base pairs of a DNA strand are connected by hydrogen bonds. In essence, the genetic code is contained by a unique arrangement of hydrogen bonds. It is believed that upon the replication of a DNA strand there is a probability for proton tunneling to occur which changes the hydrogen bond configuration; this leads to a slight alteration of the hereditary code which is the basis of mutations. Likewise, proton tunneling is also believed to be responsible for the occurrence of the dysfunction of cells (tumors and cancer) and ageing.

Proton tunneling occurs in many hydrogen based molecular crystals such as ice. It is believed that the phase transition between the hexagonal (ice Ih) and orthorhombic (ice XI) phases of ice is enabled by proton tunneling. The occurrence of correlated proton tunneling in clusters of ice has also been reported recently.

== See also ==
- Quantum tunneling
- Hydrogen bond
