= Max Planck Institute for Neurobiology of Behavior – caesar =

German research institute

Coordinates: 50°42′14″N 7°09′04″E

- Max-Planck-Institut für Neurobiologie des Verhaltens – caesar
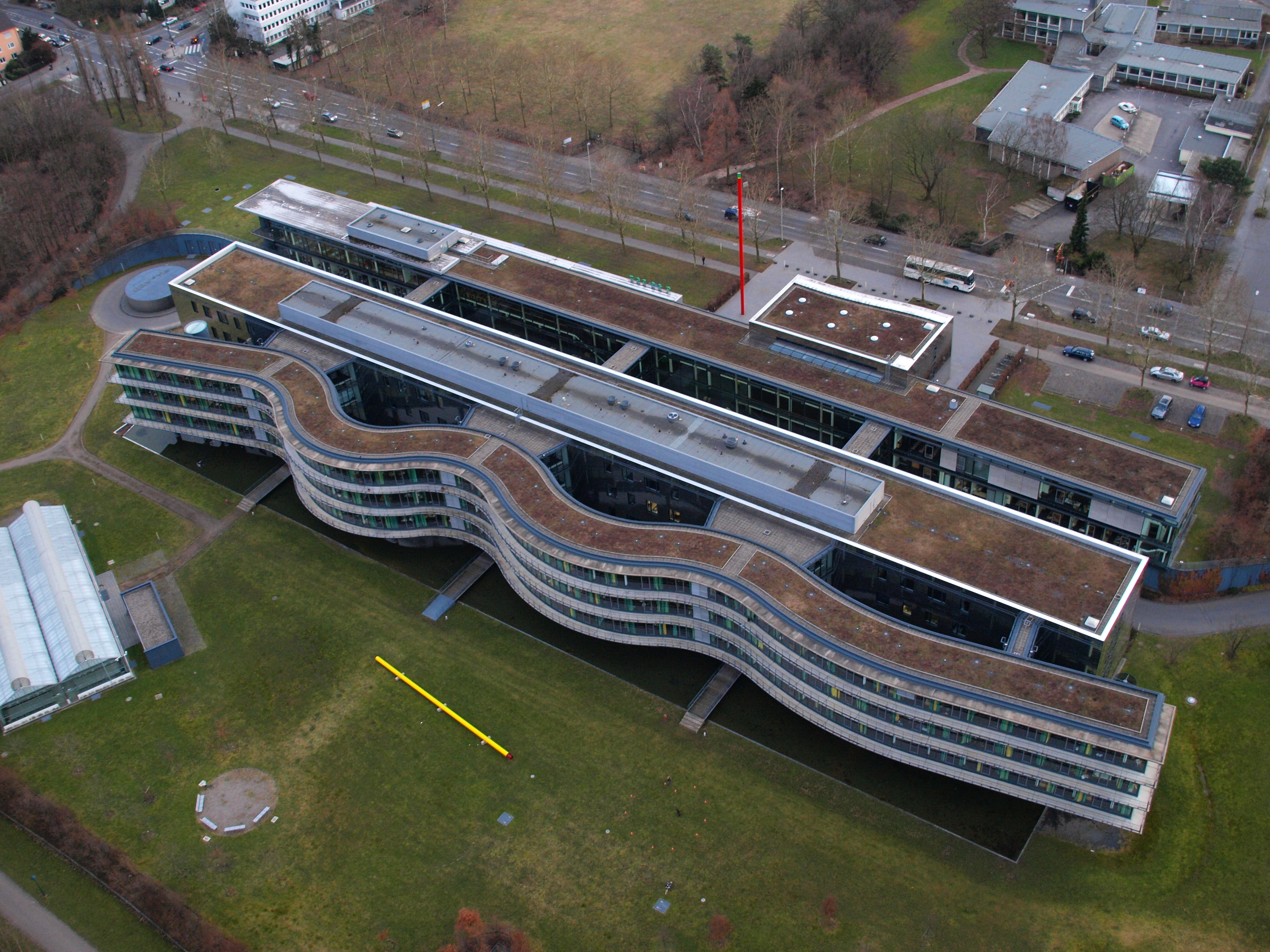
- Aerial view of the main building
- Abbreviation: MPINB
- Predecessor: Center for Advanced European Studies and Research
- Formation: 1 January 2022; 4 years ago
- Type: Research institute
- Purpose: Basic research
- Location: Bonn, Germany
- Fields: Neuroethology
- Managing Director: Kevin Briggman
- Parent organization: Max Planck Society
- Website: www.mpinb.mpg.de

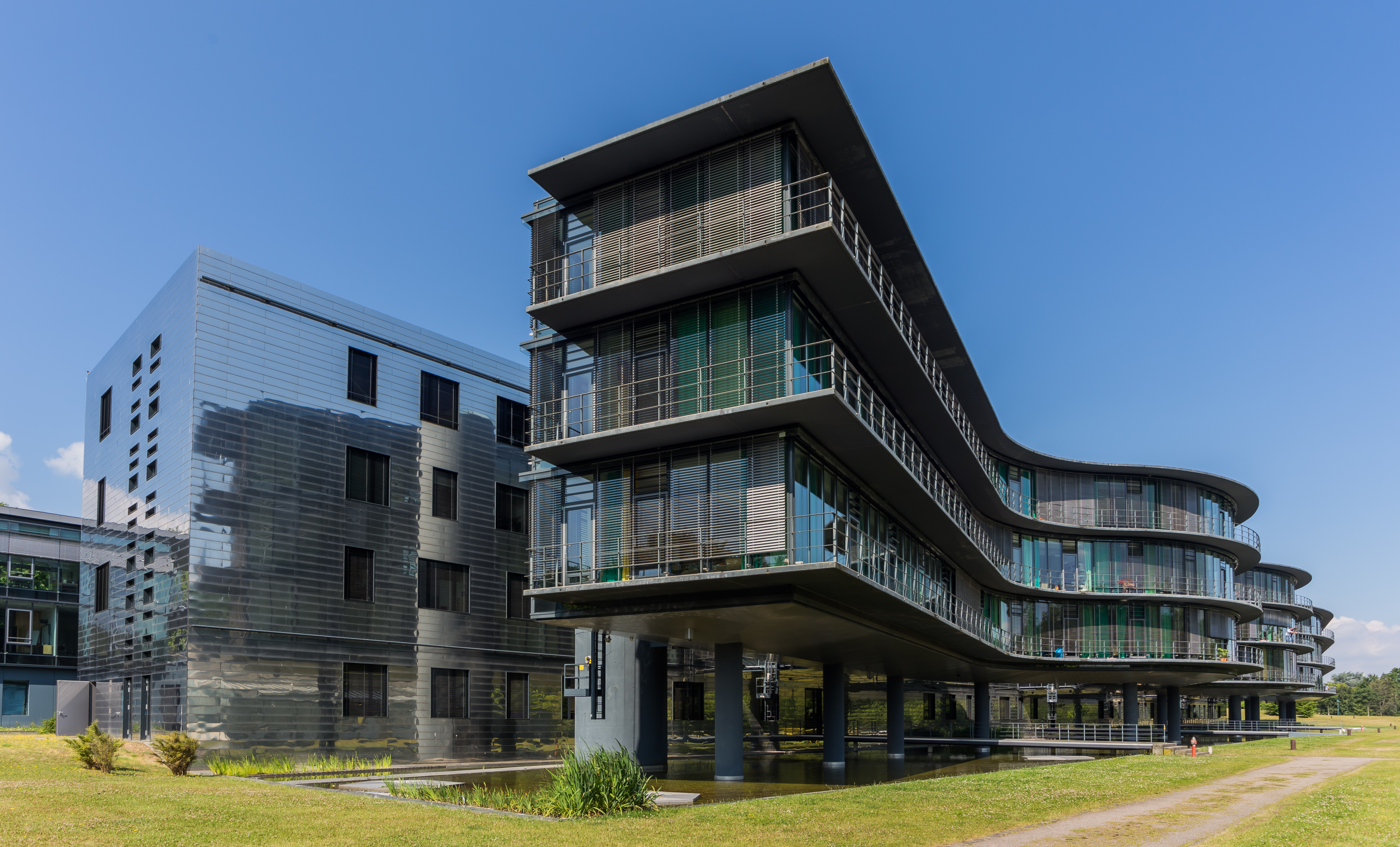
caesar building

Max Planck Institute for Neurobiology of Behavior – caesar (MPINB; German: Max-Planck-Institut für Neurobiologie des Verhaltens – caesar) in Bonn is a non-university research institute of the Max Planck Society. It was founded on 1 January 2022. The institute had been associated with the Max Planck Society since 2006, known as the Center of Advanced European Studies and Research (caesar) and has had its focus on neurosciences since this time.

The MPINB focuses on basic research in neuroethology. The international team of researchers studies the link between brain activity and animal behavior. In cooperation with the local university and research organizations, the MPINB trains the next generation of neuroethologists.

== Research ==
The team of researchers at the MPINB is interdisciplinary: biologists, physicists, computer scientists, veterinarians and psychologists investigate the causal link between neural activity and complex natural behaviors. This research leverages behavioral analysis, cellular resolution functional imaging in freely behaving animals and Electron Microscopy connectomic analysis of neuronal circuits. The neuroethological questions are comparative in nature and incorporate a diverse set of species allowing to study a wide repertoire of behaviors across animals.

=== Departments and Research Groups ===
The MPINB is home to two departments and seven independent research groups (as of March 2024).

==== Departments ====
- Computational Neuroethology (Director: Kevin Briggman). The aim of the Department of Computational Neuroethology (CNE), headed by Dr. Kevin Briggman, is to develop computational models which can predict goal-directed animal behaviors.
- Behavior and Brain Organization (Director: Jason Kerr). The primary aim of the Department of Behavior and Brain Organization, headed by Prof. Jason Kerr, is to understand how mammals use vision to make decisions and what the underlying neural processes are.

==== Research Groups ====
- Cellular Computation and Learning (Aneta Koseska). The lab focuses on identifying basic dynamical principles of biochemical computations and single-cell learning.
- Neurobiology of Magnetoreception (Pascal Malkemper). The lab studies the neurobiological basis of magnetic orientation in mammals
- In Silico Brain Sciences (Marcel Oberlaender). The lab reconstructs neural networks and elucidate mechanistic principles of how the brain integrates sensory information)
- Neurobiology of Flight control (Bettina Schnell). The lab studies how the brain of Drosophila melanogaster controls flight.
- Neural Information Flow (Monika Scholz). The lab uses the foraging behavior of the roundworm C. elegans to research general principles of signal compression, attention and context-dependency in neural systems.
- Neural Circuits (Johannes Seelig): The lab focuses on adaptive neural circuits underlying sensorimotor integration.
- Genetics of Behavior (James Lightfoot). The lab investigates the fundamental principles and molecular mechanisms behind kin-recognition and its associated social behaviors.

More and up-to-date information on the departments and independent research groups can be found on the institute’s website.

== History - The Center of Advanced European Studies and Research ==
The Center of Advanced European Study and Research (caesar) was founded in 1995 as part of the compensatory actions under the Berlin/Bonn law, which were intended to support structural change in the region of the former capital. In 2022, the institute became a full member of the Max Planck Society and is now called Max Planck Institute for Neurobiology of Behavior – caesar.

Until 2021, the independent foundation operated under private law with foundation capital from the governments of Germany and the State of North Rhine-Westphalia.

Caesar was closely associated with the Max Planck Society (MPG). The President of the Max Planck Society chaired the board of trustees. The caesar-directors have been scientific members of the Max Planck Society. The appointment of the directors, the evaluations and the safeguarding of scientific excellence were realized according to the criteria of the Max Planck Society.

The foundation operated a research center, which did research in the field of neurosciences with modern photonic, molecular biological and chemical methods as well as methods of microtechnology. Here, particularly optical methods have been utilized for brain research and brain control. Over the years, the focus was more and more on neuroethology and on the question how brains control behavior.

Within the main building there used to be the Life Science Inkubator (LSI). The LSI was a public–private partnership (PPP), one partner being caesar. Other partners were e.g. Fraunhofer Society and Helmholtz Association of German Research Centres.
