= Spin chemistry =

Chemistry subfield

Spin chemistry is a sub-field of chemistry positioned at the intersection of chemical kinetics, photochemistry, magnetic resonance and free radical chemistry, that deals with magnetic and spin effects in chemical reactions. Spin chemistry concerns phenomena such as chemically induced dynamic nuclear polarization (CIDNP), chemically induced electron polarization (CIDEP), magnetic isotope effects in chemical reactions, and it is hypothesized to be key in the underlying mechanism for avian magnetoreception.

== Radical-pair mechanism ==
The radical-pair mechanism explains how a magnetic field can affect reaction kinetics by affecting electron spin dynamics. Most commonly demonstrated in reactions of organic compounds involving radical intermediates, a magnetic field can speed up a reaction by decreasing the frequency of reverse reactions.

=== History ===
The radical-pair mechanism emerged as an explanation to CIDNP and CIDEP and was proposed in 1969 by Closs; Kaptein and Oosterhoff.

=== Radicals and radical-pairs ===
Example radical: Structure of Hydrocarboxyl radical, lone electron indicated as single black dot

A radical is a molecule with an odd number of electrons, and is induced in a variety of ways, including ultraviolet radiation. A sun burn is largely due to radical formation from this radiation. The radical-pair, however, is not simply two radicals. This is because radical-pairs (specifically singlets) are quantum entangled, even as separate molecules. More fundamental to the radical-pair mechanism, however, is the fact that radical-pair electrons both have spin, short for spin angular momentum, which gives each separate radical a magnetic moment. Therefore, spin states can be altered by magnetic fields.

=== Singlet and triplet spin states ===
The radical-pair is characterized as triplet or singlet by the spin state of the two lone electrons, paired together. The spin relationship is such that the two unpaired electrons, one in each radical molecule, may have opposite spin (singlet; anticorrelated), or the same spin (triplet; correlated). The singlet state is called such because there is only one way for the electrons’ spins to anticorrelate (S), whereas the triplet state is called such because the electron's spin may be correlated in three different fashions, denoted T_{+1}, T_{0}, and T_{−1}.

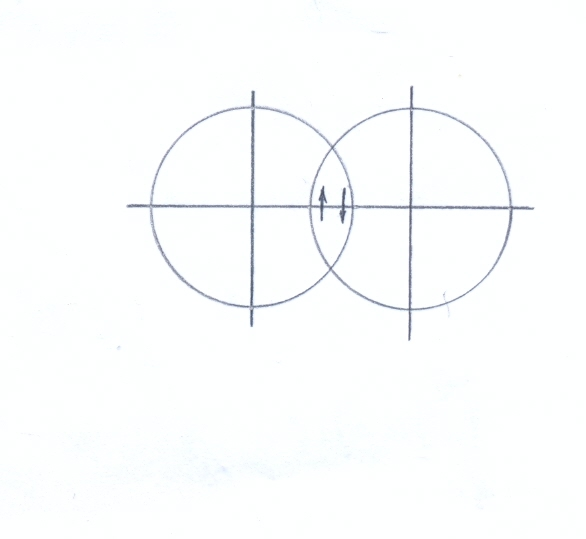
Simple diagram of bonding between electrons with opposite spin

=== Reaction kinetics and the Zeeman interaction ===
Spin states relate to chemical and biochemical reaction mechanisms because bonds can be formed only between two electrons of opposite spin (Hund's rules). Sometimes when a bond is broken in a particular manner, for example, when struck by photons, each electron in the bond relocates to each respective molecule, and a radical-pair is formed. Furthermore, the spin of each electron previously involved in the bond is conserved, which means that the radical-pair now formed is a singlet (each electron has opposite spin, as in the origin bond). As such, the reverse reaction, i.e. the reforming of a bond, called recombination, readily occurs. The radical-pair mechanism explains how external magnetic fields can prevent radical-pair recombination with Zeeman interactions, the interaction between spin and an external magnetic field, and shows how a higher occurrence of the triplet state accelerates radical reactions because triplets can proceed only to products, and singlets are in equilibrium with the reactants as well as with the products.

Zeeman interactions can "flip" only one of the radical's electron's spin if the radical-pair is anisotropic, thereby converting singlet radical-pairs to triplets.

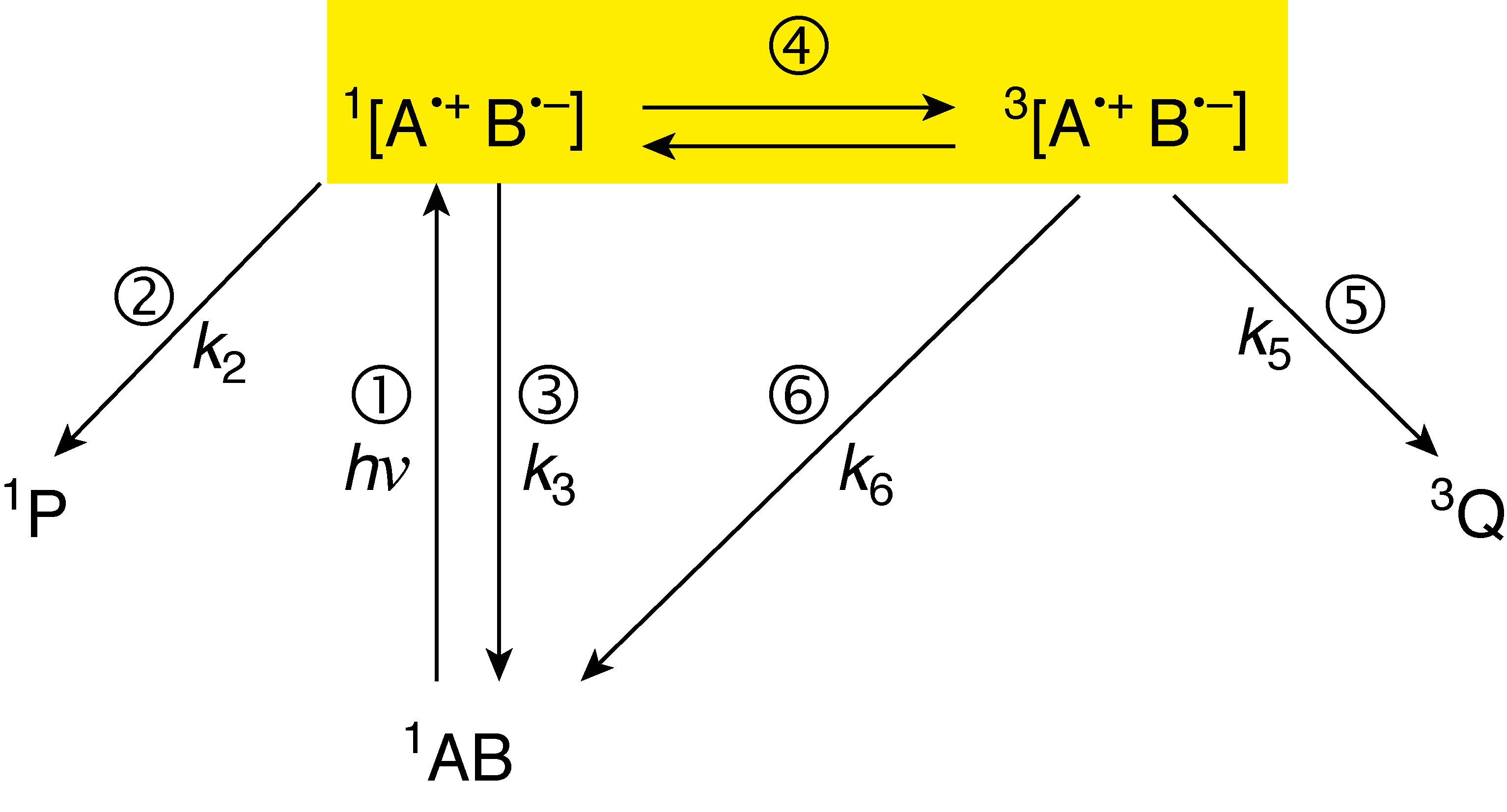
Typical Reaction Scheme of the Radical-pair Mechanism, which shows the effect of alternative product formation from singlet versus triplet radical-pairs. The Zeeman and Hyperfine Interactions take effect in the yellow box, denoted as step 4 in the process

The Zeeman interaction is an interaction between spin and external magnetic field, and is given by the equation

$$\Delta E=h\nu_\text{L}=g\mu_\text{B}B,$$

where $\Delta E$ is the energy of the Zeeman interaction, $\nu_\text{L}$ is the Larmor frequency, $B$ is the external magnetic field, $\mu_\text{B}$ is the Bohr magneton, $h$ is the Planck constant, and $g$ is the g-factor of a free electron, −2.002319, times -1. The g-factor is slightly different in different radicals.

It is common to see the Zeeman interaction formulated in other ways.

=== Hyperfine interactions ===
Hyperfine interactions, the internal magnetic fields of local magnetic isotopes, play a significant role as well in the spin dynamics of radical-pairs.

=== Zeeman interactions and magnetoreception ===
Because the Zeeman interaction is a function of magnetic field and Larmor frequency, it can be obstructed or amplified by altering the external magnetic or the Larmor frequency with experimental instruments that generate oscillating fields. It has been observed that migratory birds lose their navigational abilities in such conditions where the Zeeman interaction is obstructed in radical-pairs.
