= Magnetoreception =

Biological ability to perceive magnetic fields

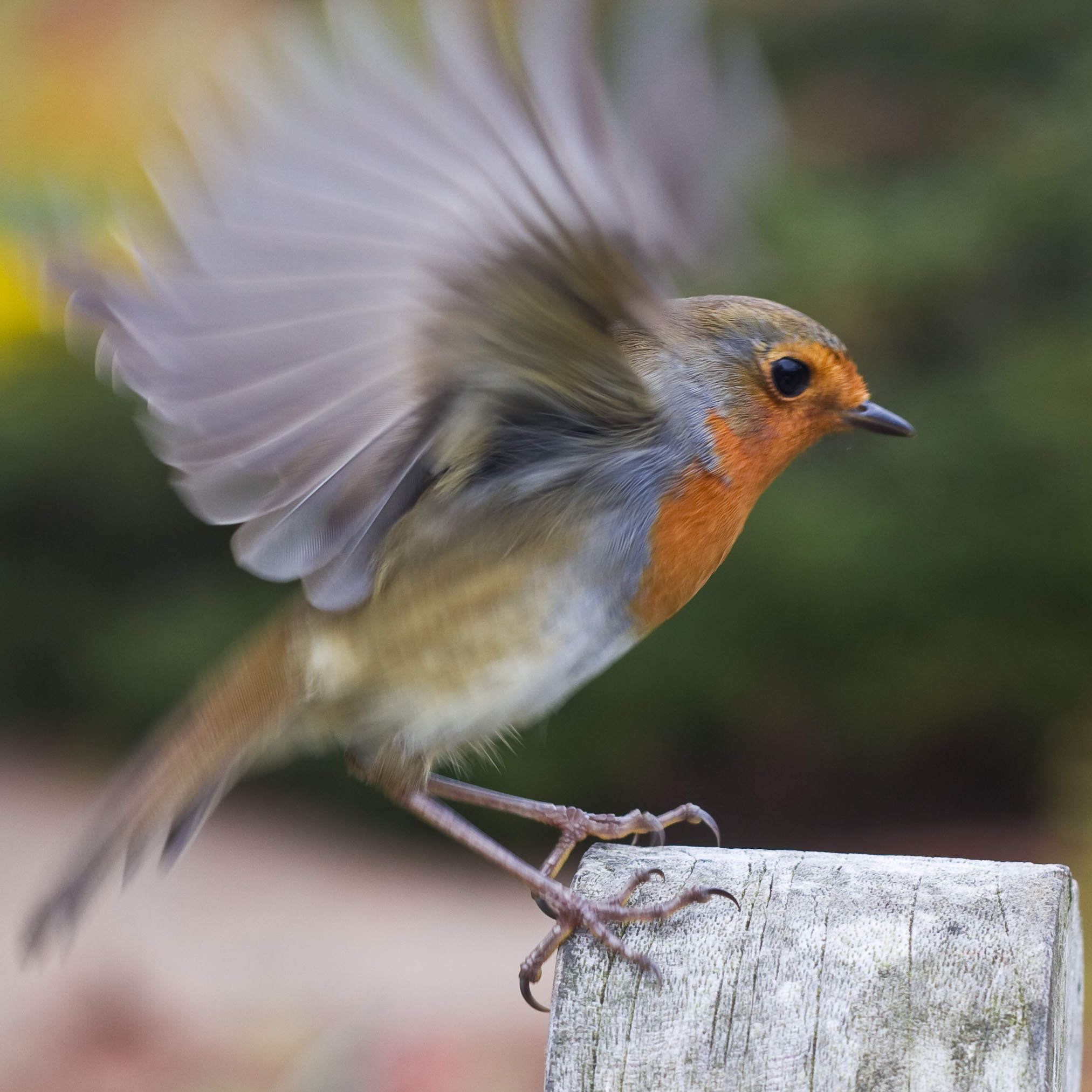
Experiments on European robins, which are migratory, suggest their magnetic sense makes use of the quantum radical pair mechanism.

Magnetoreception is a sense which allows an organism to detect the Earth's magnetic field. Animals with this sense include some arthropods, molluscs, and vertebrates (fish, amphibians, reptiles, birds, and mammals). The sense is mainly used for orientation and navigation, but it may help some animals to form regional maps. Experiments on migratory birds provide evidence that they make use of a cryptochrome protein in the eye, relying on the quantum radical pair mechanism to perceive magnetic fields. This effect is extremely sensitive to weak magnetic fields, and readily disturbed by radio-frequency interference, unlike a conventional iron compass. Some bacteria orient passively using magnetite crystals; the mechanism has not been reliably detected in eukaryotes.

Cartilaginous fish including sharks and stingrays can detect small variations in electric potential with their electroreceptive organs, the ampullae of Lorenzini. These appear to be able to detect magnetic fields by induction. There is some evidence that these fish use magnetic fields in navigation.

== History ==
Biologists have long wondered whether migrating animals such as birds and sea turtles have an inbuilt magnetic compass, enabling them to navigate using the Earth's magnetic field. Until late in the 20th century, evidence for this was essentially only behavioural: many experiments demonstrated that animals could indeed derive information from the magnetic field around them, but gave no indication of the mechanism. In 1972, Roswitha and Wolfgang Wiltschko showed that migratory birds responded to the direction and inclination (dip) of the magnetic field. In 1997, M. M. Walker and colleagues identified iron-based (magnetite) magnetoreceptors in the snouts of rainbow trout. In 2003, G. Fleissner and colleagues claimed to have found iron-based receptors in the upper beaks of homing pigeons, but subsequent studies employing high resolution electron microscopy revealed that the cells identified are in fact macrophages. Research took a different direction in 2000, when Thorsten Ritz and colleagues suggested that a photoreceptor protein in the eye, cryptochrome, was a magnetoreceptor, working at a molecular scale by quantum entanglement.

== Proposed mechanisms ==
=== Passive iron-based alignment in bacteria ===
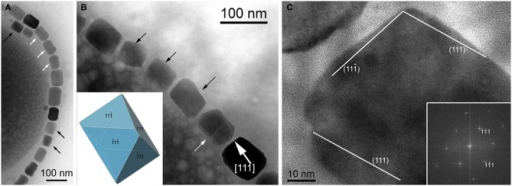
Magnetite magnetosomes in Gammaproteobacteria strain SS-5. (A) Chain of highly elongated magnetosomes. (B) Part of a chain. (C) The magnetosome in the lower right in (B), viewed along the $\scriptstyle [1\overline{1}0]$ direction, with its Fourier transform in the lower right.

Magnetotactic bacteria of multiple taxa contain sufficient magnetic material in the form of magnetosomes, nanometer-sized particles of iron-containing magnetite, that the Earth's magnetic field passively aligns them, just as it does with a compass needle. The bacteria are thus not actually sensing the magnetic field.

A possible but unexplored mechanism of magnetoreception in animals is through endosymbiosis with magnetotactic bacteria, whose DNA is widespread in animals. This would involve having these bacteria living inside an animal, and their magnetic alignment being used as part of a magnetoreceptive system.

While numerous studies have claimed to identify magnetite-based magneotoreceptors in vertebrates such as birds, none have been independently replicated; most have been shown to be iron-rich macrophages or environmental contaminants.

=== In animals ===
In animals, the mechanism for magnetoreception is still under investigation. Three main hypotheses are currently being discussed: one proposing a quantum compass based on a radical pair mechanism, one postulating an iron-based magnetic compass with magnetite particles, and a third that relies on electromagnetic induction.

==== Cryptochrome ====
The radical pair mechanism has been proposed for quantum magnetoreception in birds. It takes place in cryptochrome molecules in cells in the birds' retinas.

According to the first model, magnetoreception is possible via the radical pair mechanism, which is well-established in spin chemistry. The mechanism requires two molecules, each with unpaired electrons, at a suitable distance from each other. When these can exist in states either with their spin axes in the same direction, or in opposite directions, the molecules oscillate rapidly between the two states. That oscillation is extremely sensitive to magnetic fields. Because the Earth's magnetic field is extremely weak, at 0.5 gauss, the radical pair mechanism is currently the only credible way that the Earth's magnetic field could cause chemical changes (as opposed to the mechanical forces which would be detected via magnetic crystals acting like a compass needle).

In 1978, Schulten and colleagues proposed that this was the mechanism of magnetoreception. In 2000, scientists proposed that cryptochrome – a flavoprotein in the rod cells in the eyes of birds – was the "magnetic molecule" behind this effect. It is the only protein known to form photoinduced radical-pairs in animals. The function of cryptochrome varies by species, but its mechanism is always the same: exposure to blue light excites an electron in a chromophore, which causes the formation of a radical-pair whose electrons are quantum entangled, enabling the precision needed for magnetoreception.

Many lines of evidence point to cryptochrome and radical pairs as the mechanism of magnetoreception in birds:

- Despite 20 years of searching, no biomolecule other than cryptochrome has been identified capable of supporting radical pairs.
- In cryptochrome, a yellow molecule flavin adenine dinucleotide (FAD) can absorb a photon of blue light, putting the cryptochrome into an activated state: an electron is transferred from a tryptophan amino acid to the FAD molecule, forming a radical pair.
- Of the six types of cryptochrome in birds, cryptochrome-4a (Cry4a) binds FAD much more tightly than the rest.
- Cry4a levels in migratory birds, which rely on navigation for their survival, are highest during the spring and autumn migration periods, when navigation is most critical.
- The Cry4a protein from the European robin, a migratory bird, is much more sensitive to magnetic fields than similar but not identical Cry4a from pigeons and chickens, which are non-migratory.

These findings together suggest that the Cry4a of migratory birds has been selected for its magnetic sensitivity.

Behavioral experiments on migratory birds support this theory. Caged migratory birds such as robins display migratory restlessness, known by ethologists as Zugunruhe, in spring and autumn: they often orient themselves in the direction in which they would migrate. In 2004, Thorsten Ritz showed that a weak radio-frequency electromagnetic field, chosen to be at the same frequency as the singlet-triplet oscillation of cryptochrome radical pairs, effectively interfered with the birds' orientation. The field would not have interfered with an iron-based compass. Further, birds are unable to detect a 180 degree reversal of the magnetic field, something they would straightforwardly detect with an iron-based compass.

Very weak radio-frequency interference prevents migratory robins from orienting correctly to the Earth's magnetic field. Since this would not interfere with an iron compass, the experiments imply that the birds use a radical-pair mechanism.

From 2007 onwards, Henrik Mouritsen attempted to replicate this experiment. Instead, he found that robins were unable to orient themselves in the wooden huts he used. Suspecting extremely weak radio-frequency interference from other electrical equipment on the campus, he tried shielding the huts with aluminium sheeting, which blocks electrical noise but not magnetic fields. When he earthed the sheeting, the robins oriented correctly; when the earthing was removed, the robins oriented at random. Finally, when the robins were tested in a hut far from electrical equipment, the birds oriented correctly. These effects imply a radical-pair compass, not an iron one.

In 2016, Wiltschko and colleagues showed that European robins were unaffected by local anaesthesia of the upper beak, showing that in these test conditions orientation was not from iron-based receptors in the beak. In their view, cryptochrome and its radical pairs provide the only model that can explain the avian magnetic compass. A scheme with three radicals rather than two has been proposed as more resistant to spin relaxation and explaining the observed behaviour better.

==== Electromagnetic induction ====
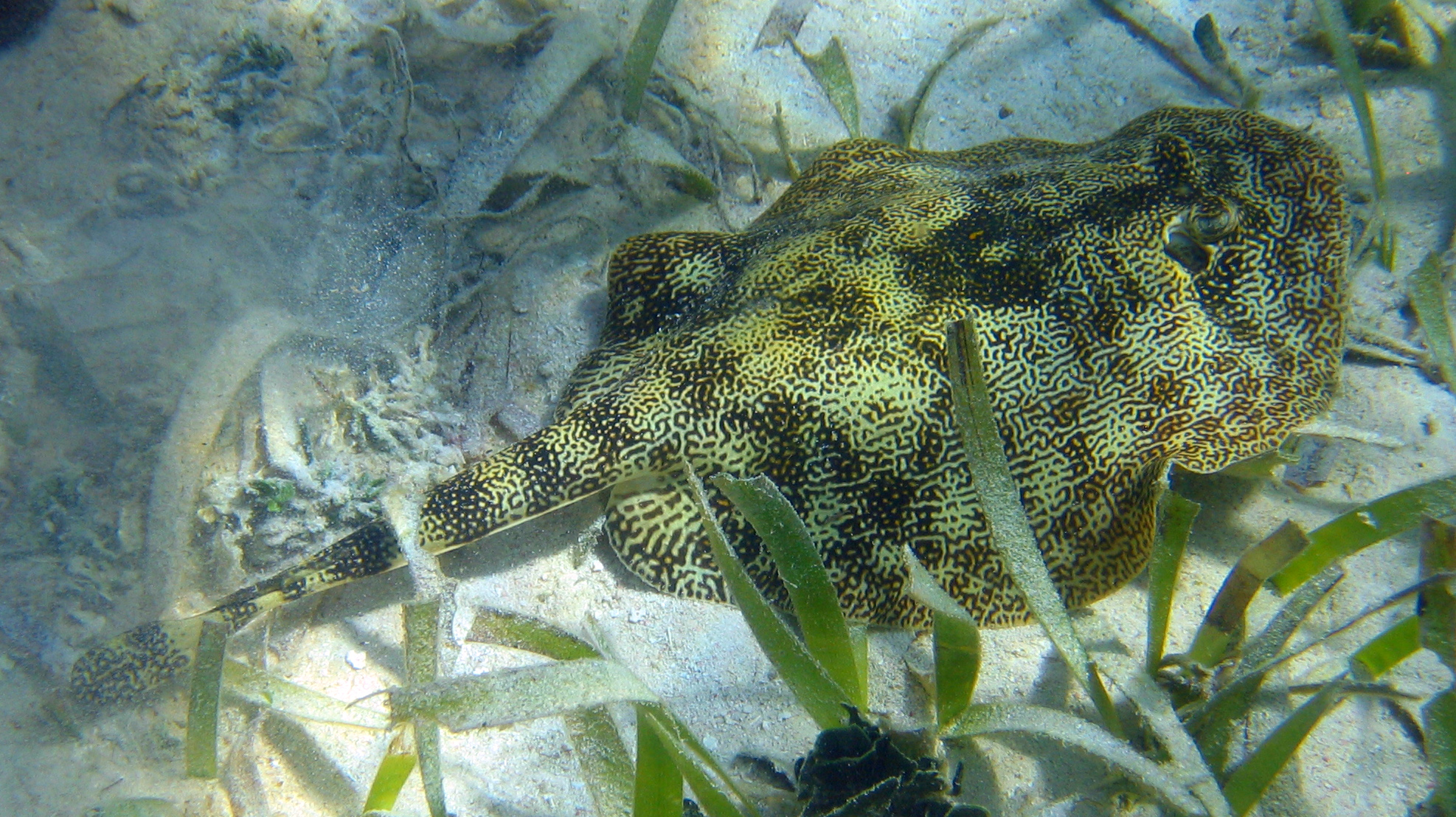
The yellow stingray is able to sense the intensity and inclination angle of a magnetic field.

Another possible mechanism of magnetoreception in animals is electromagnetic induction in cartilaginous fish, namely sharks, stingrays, and chimaeras. These fish have electroreceptive organs, the ampullae of Lorenzini, which can detect small variations in electric potential. The organs are mucus-filled and consist of canals that connect pores in the skin of the mouth and nose to small sacs within the animal's flesh. They are used to sense the weak electric fields of prey and predators. These organs have been predicted to sense magnetic fields, by means of Faraday's law of induction: as a conductor moves through a magnetic field an electric potential is generated. In this case the conductor is the animal moving through a magnetic field, and the potential induced (V_{ind}) depends on the time (t)-varying rate of magnetic flux (Φ) through the conductor according to
$$V_{ind}=-\frac{d\Phi}{dt}$$

The ampullae of Lorenzini detect very small fluctuations in the potential difference between the pore and the base of the electroreceptor sac. An increase in potential results in a decrease in the rate of nerve activity. This is analogous to the behavior of a current-carrying conductor. Sandbar sharks, Carcharinus plumbeus, have been shown to be able to detect magnetic fields; the experiments provided non-definitive evidence that the animals had a magnetoreceptor, rather than relying on induction and electroreceptors. Electromagnetic induction has not been studied in non-aquatic animals.

The yellow stingray, Urobatis jamaicensis, is able to distinguish between the intensity and inclination angle of a magnetic field in the laboratory. This suggests that cartilaginous fishes may use the Earth's magnetic field for navigation.

== Unanswered questions ==
It remains likely that two or more complementary mechanisms play a role in magnetic field detection in animals. Of course, this potential dual mechanism theory raises the questions of to what degree each method is responsible for the stimulus, and how they produce a signal in response to the weak magnetic field of the Earth.

In addition, it is possible that magnetic senses may be different for different species. Some species may only be able to detect north and south, while others may only be able to differentiate between the equator and the poles. Although the ability to sense direction is important in migratory navigation, many animals have the ability to sense small fluctuations in earth's magnetic field to map their position to within a few kilometers.

== Taxonomic range ==
Magnetoreception is widely distributed taxonomically. It is present in many of the animals so far investigated. These include arthropods, molluscs, and among vertebrates in fish, amphibians, reptiles, birds, and mammals. Its status in other groups remains unknown.

The ability to detect and respond to magnetic fields may exist in plants, possibly as in animals mediated by cryptochrome. Experiments by different scientists have identified multiple effects, including changes to growth rate, seed germination, mitochondrial structure, and responses to gravity (geotropism). The results have sometimes been controversial, and no mechanism has been definitely identified. The ability may be widely distributed, but its taxonomic range in plants is unknown.

- Eukaryotes cryptochrome
  - - Animals
      - Vertebrates
        - Fishes inc. sockeye salmon
        - - Amphibians inc. cave salamander
          - - Mammals inc. big brown bat
            - - Reptiles inc. box turtle
              - Birds inc. homing pigeon
      - Protostomes
        - Insects
          - Diptera inc. fruit fly
          - Hymenoptera inc. honey bee
        - Molluscs
          inc. giant sea slug
  - Plants inc. pea

=== In molluscs ===
The giant sea slug Tochuina gigantea (formerly T. tetraquetra), a mollusc, orients its body between north and east prior to a full moon. A 1991 experiment offered a right turn to geomagnetic south and a left turn to geomagnetic east (a Y-shaped maze). 80% of Tochuina made a turn to magnetic east. When the field was reversed, the animals displayed no preference for either turn. Tochuina's nervous system is composed of individually identifiable neurons, four of which are stimulated by changes in the applied magnetic field, and two which are inhibited by such changes. The tracks of the similar species Tritonia exsulans become more variable in direction when close to strong rare-earth magnets placed in their natural habitat, suggesting that the animal uses its magnetic sense continuously to help it travel in a straight line.

=== In insects ===
The fruit fly Drosophila melanogaster may be able to orient to magnetic fields. In one choice test, flies were loaded into an apparatus with two arms that were surrounded by electric coils. Current was run through each of the coils, but only one was configured to produce a 5-Gauss magnetic field (about ten times stronger than the Earth's magnetic field) at a time. The flies were trained to associate the magnetic field with a sucrose reward. Flies with an altered cryptochrome, such as with an antisense mutation, were not sensitive to magnetic fields.

Magnetoreception has been studied in detail in insects including honey bees, ants and termites. Ants and bees navigate using their magnetic sense both locally (near their nests) and when migrating. In particular, the Brazilian stingless bee Schwarziana quadripunctata is able to detect magnetic fields using the thousands of hair-like sensilla on its antennae.

=== In vertebrates ===
==== In fish ====
Studies of magnetoreception in bony fish have been conducted mainly with salmon. Both sockeye salmon (Oncorhynchus nerka) and Chinook salmon (Oncorhynchus tschawytscha) have a compass sense. This was demonstrated in experiments in the 1980s by changing the axis of a magnetic field around a circular tank of young fish; they reoriented themselves in line with the field.

==== In amphibians ====
Some of the earliest studies of amphibian magnetoreception were conducted with cave salamanders (Eurycea lucifuga). Researchers housed groups of cave salamanders in corridors aligned with either magnetic north–south, or magnetic east–west. In tests, the magnetic field was experimentally rotated by 90°, and salamanders were placed in cross-shaped structures (one corridor along the new north–south axis, one along the new east–west axis). The salamanders responded to the field's rotation.

Red-spotted newts (Notophthalmus viridescens) respond to drastic increases in water temperature by heading for land. The behaviour is disrupted if the magnetic field is experimentally altered, showing that the newts use the field for orientation.

Both European toads (Bufo bufo) and natterjack toads (Epidalea calamita) toads rely on vision and olfaction when migrating to breeding sites, but magnetic fields may also play a role. When randomly displaced 150 metres (490 ft) from their breeding sites, these toads can navigate their way back, but this ability can be disrupted by fitting them with small magnets.

==== In reptiles ====
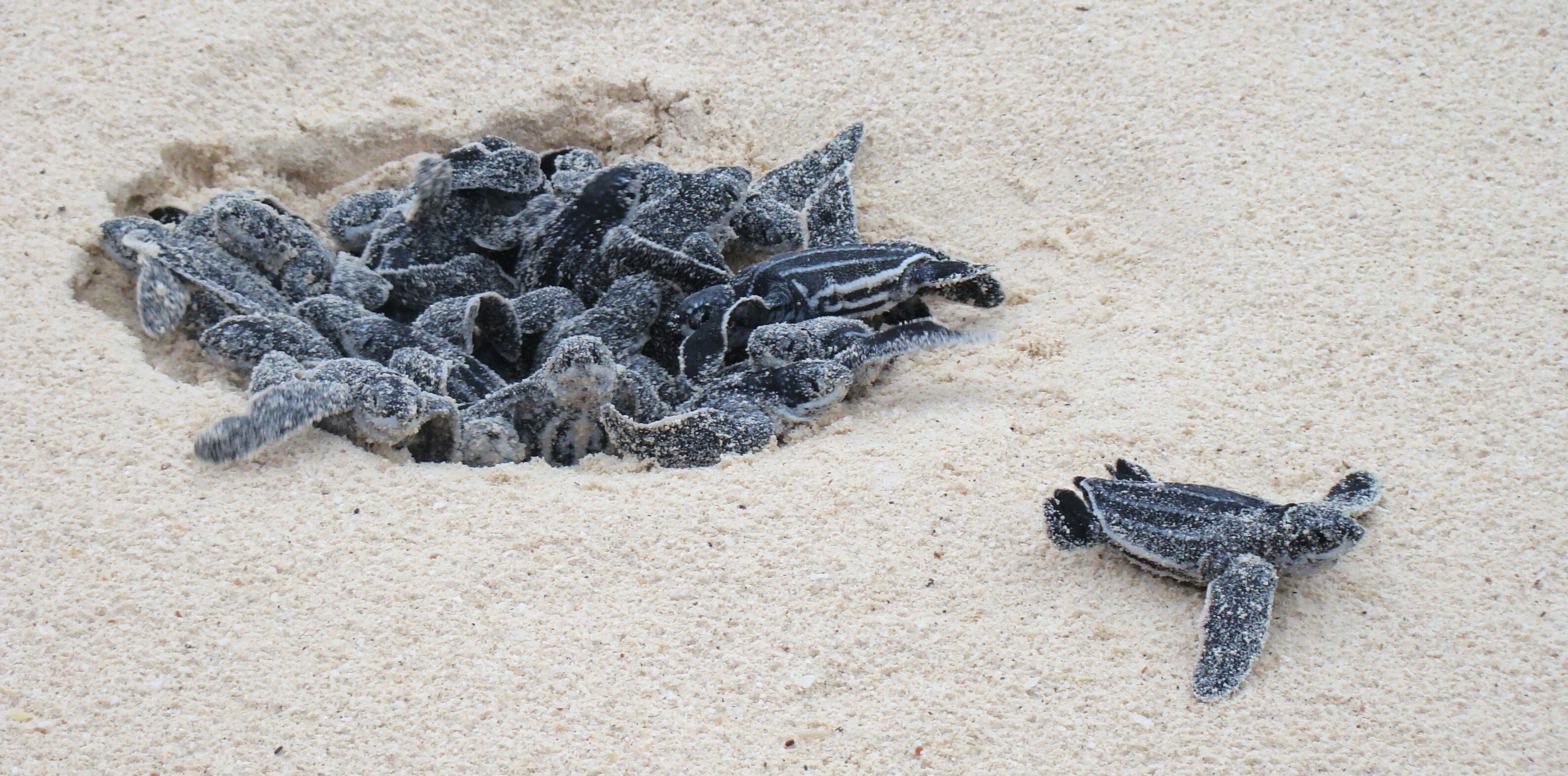
Magnetoreception plays a part in guiding loggerhead hatchlings to the sea.

The majority of study on magnetoreception in reptiles involves turtles. Early support for magnetoreception in turtles was provided in a 1991 study on hatchling loggerhead turtles which demonstrated that loggerheads can use the magnetic field as a compass to determine direction. Subsequent studies have demonstrated that loggerhead and green turtles can also use the magnetic field of the earth as a map, because different parameters of the Earth's magnetic field vary with geographic location. The map in sea turtles was the first ever described though similar abilities have now been reported in lobsters, fish, and birds. Magnetoreception by land turtles was shown in a 2010 experiment on Terrapene carolina, a box turtle. After teaching a group of these box turtles to swim to either the east or west end of an experimental tank, a strong magnet disrupted the learned routes.

Orientation toward the sea, as seen in turtle hatchlings, may rely partly on magnetoreception. In loggerhead and leatherback turtles, breeding takes place on beaches, and, after hatching, offspring crawl rapidly to the sea. Although differences in light density seem to drive this behaviour, magnetic alignment appears to play a part. For instance, the natural directional preferences held by these hatchlings (which lead them from beaches to the sea) reverse upon experimental inversion of the magnetic poles.

==== In birds ====
Homing pigeons use magnetic fields as part of their complex navigation system. William Keeton showed that time-shifted homing pigeons (acclimatised in the laboratory to a different time-zone) are unable to orient themselves correctly on a clear, sunny day; this is attributed to time-shifted pigeons being unable to compensate accurately for the movement of the sun during the day. Conversely, time-shifted pigeons released on overcast days navigate correctly, suggesting that pigeons can use magnetic fields to orient themselves; this ability can be disrupted with magnets attached to the birds' backs. Pigeons can detect magnetic anomalies as weak as 1.86 gauss.

For a long time the trigeminal system was the suggested location for a magnetite-based magnetoreceptor in the pigeon. This was based on two findings: First, magnetite-containing cells were reported in specific locations in the upper beak. However, the cells proved to be immune system macrophages, not neurons able to detect magnetic fields. Second, pigeon magnetic field detection is impaired by sectioning the trigeminal nerve and by application of lidocaine, an anaesthetic, to the olfactory mucosa. However, lidocaine treatment might lead to unspecific effects and not represent a direct interference with potential magnetoreceptors. As a result, an involvement of the trigeminal system is still debated. In the search for magnetite receptors, a large iron-containing organelle (the cuticulosome) of unknown function was found in the inner ear of pigeons.

Areas of the pigeon brain found in a 2011 study to respond with increased activity to magnetic fields are the posterior vestibular nuclei, dorsal thalamus, hippocampus, and visual hyperpallium. The vestibular nuclei receive information from the inner ear including the semicircular canals. This suggests that bird sense magnetism in the inner ear. A 2025 study in Science presents two lines of evidence that pigeons sense magnetic fields in their inner ears. Firstly, brain mapping found populations of neurons whose activity is triggered by magnetic fields. Neuron activity was measured using a genetic marker. Brain activity of pigeons exposed to a rotating magnetic field was found in the part of the brain linked to the semicircular canals, and other regions that collate sensory information. Secondly, RNA sequencing in single inner ear cells of the semicircular canals found "the molecular machinery necessary for the detection of magnetic stimuli by electromagnetic induction."

Chickens have iron mineral deposits in the sensory dendrites in the upper beak and are capable of magnetoreception. Beak trimming causes loss of the magnetic sense.

Superparamagnetic macrophages are present in the liver of pigeons. After macrophage depletion, pigeons flying under overcast conditions lacked their usual orientation capabilities. The superparamagnetic macrophages appear to be required for sensing magnetic direction.

==== In mammals ====
Some mammals are capable of magnetoreception. When woodmice are removed from their home area and deprived of visual and olfactory cues, they orient towards their homes until an inverted magnetic field is applied to their cage. When the same mice are allowed access to visual cues, they are able to orient themselves towards home despite the presence of inverted magnetic fields. This indicates that woodmice use magnetic fields to orient themselves when no other cues are available. The magnetic sense of woodmice is likely based on a radical-pair mechanism.

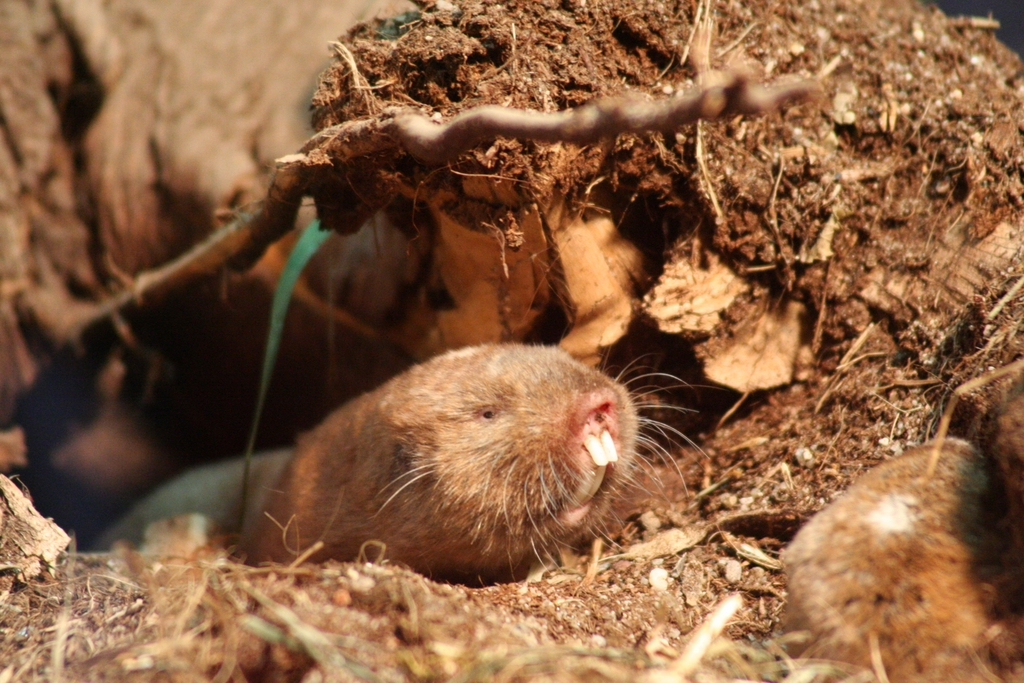
The Zambian mole-rat is one of several mammals that use magnetic fields, in their case for nest orientation.

The Zambian mole-rat, a subterranean mammal, uses magnetic fields to aid in nest orientation. In contrast to woodmice, Zambian mole-rats do not rely on radical-pair based magnetoreception, perhaps due to their subterranean lifestyle. Experimental exposure to magnetic fields leads to an increase in neural activity within the superior colliculus, as measured by immediate gene expression. The activity level of neurons within two levels of the superior colliculus, the outer sublayer of the intermediate gray layer and the deep gray layer, were elevated in a non-specific manner when exposed to various magnetic fields. However, within the inner sublayer of the intermediate gray layer (InGi) there were two or three clusters of cells that respond in a more specific manner. The more time the mole rats were exposed to a magnetic field, the greater the immediate early gene expression within the InGi.

Magnetic fields appear to play a role in bat orientation. They use echolocation to orient themselves over short distances, typically ranging from a few centimetres up to 50 metres. When non-migratory big brown bats (Eptesicus fuscus) are taken from their home roosts and exposed to magnetic fields rotated 90 degrees from magnetic north, they become disoriented; it is unclear whether they use the magnetic sense as a map, a compass, or a compass calibrator. Another bat species, the greater mouse-eared bat (Myotis myotis), appears to use the Earth's magnetic field in its home range as a compass, but needs to calibrate this at sunset or dusk. In migratory soprano pipistrelles (Pipistrellus pygmaeus), experiments using mirrors and Helmholtz coils show that they calibrate the magnetic field using the position of the solar disk at sunset.

Red foxes (Vulpes vulpes) may be influenced by the Earth's magnetic field when predating small rodents like mice and voles. They attack these prey using a specific high-jump, preferring a north-eastern compass direction. Successful attacks are tightly clustered to the north.

There is not yet a consensus on whether humans can sense magnetic fields, but some evidence suggests it. The ethmoid bone in the nose contains magnetic materials. Magnetosensitive cryptochrome 2 (cry2) is present in the human retina. Human alpha brain waves are affected by magnetic fields, but it is not known whether behaviour is affected.

== See also ==
- Electroreception
- Magnetobiology
- Quantum biology
- Salmon run
