= CIDNP =

Nuclear magnetic resonance technique used to study chemical reactions

CIDNP (chemically induced dynamic nuclear polarization), often pronounced like "kidnip", is a nuclear magnetic resonance (NMR) technique that is used to study chemical reactions that involve radicals. It detects the non-Boltzmann (non-thermal) nuclear spin state distribution produced in these reactions as enhanced absorption or emission signals.

CIDNP was discovered in 1967 by Bargon and Fischer, and, independently, by Ward and Lawler. Early theories were based on dynamic nuclear polarisation (hence the name) using the Overhauser effect. The subsequent experiments, however, have found that in many cases DNP fails to explain CIDNP polarization phase. In 1969 an alternative explanation arose which relies on the nuclear spins affecting the probability of a radical pair recombining or separating.

It is related to chemically induced dynamic electron polarization (CIDEP) insofar as the radical-pair mechanism explains both phenomena.

== Concept and experimental set-up ==
The effect is detected by NMR spectroscopy, usually using ^{1}H NMR spectrum, as enhanced absorption or emission signals ("negative peaks"). The effect arises when unpaired electrons (radicals) are generated during a chemical reaction involving heat or light within the NMR tube. The magnetic field in the spectrometer interacts with the magnetic fields that are caused by the spins of the protons. The two spins of protons produce two slightly different energy levels. In normal conditions, slightly more nuclei, about 10 parts in a million are found in the lower energy level. In contrast, CIDNP produces greatly imbalanced populations, with far greater numbers of spins in upper energy level in some products of the reaction and greater numbers in the lower energy level in other products. The spectrometer uses radio frequencies to detect these differences.

== Radical-pair mechanism ==
The radical-pair mechanism is currently accepted as the most common cause of CIDNP. This theory was proposed by Closs, and, independently, by Kaptein and Oosterhoff. There are, however, exceptions, and the DNP mechanism was found to be operational, for example, in many fluorine-containing radicals.

The chemical bond is a pair of electrons with opposite spins. Photochemical reactions or heat can cause an electron in the bond to change its spin. The electrons are now unpaired, in what is known as a triplet state, and the bond is broken. The orientation of some of the nuclear spins will favour some unpaired electrons changing their spins and so revert to the normal pairs as chemical bonds. This quantum interaction is known as spin–orbit coupling. Other nuclear spins will exert a different influence on the triplet pairs, giving the radical pairs more time to separate and react with other molecules. Consequently, the products of recombination will have different distributions of nuclear spins from the products produced by separated radicals.

== Typical photochemical reaction ==
The generation of CIDNP in a typical photochemical system (target + photosensitizer, flavin in this example) is a cyclic photochemical process shown schematically in Figure 1. The chain of reactions is initiated by a blue light photon, which excites the flavin mononucleotide (FMN) photosensitizer to the singlet excited state. The fluorescence quantum yield of this state is rather low, and approximately half of the molecules undergo intersystem crossing into the long-lived triplet state. Triplet FMN has a remarkable electron affinity. If a molecule with a low ionization potential (e.g. phenols, polyaromatics) is present in the system, the diffusion-limited electron transfer reaction forms a spin-correlated triplet electron transfer state – a radical pair. The kinetics are complicated and may involve multiple protonations and deprotonations, and hence exhibit pH dependence.

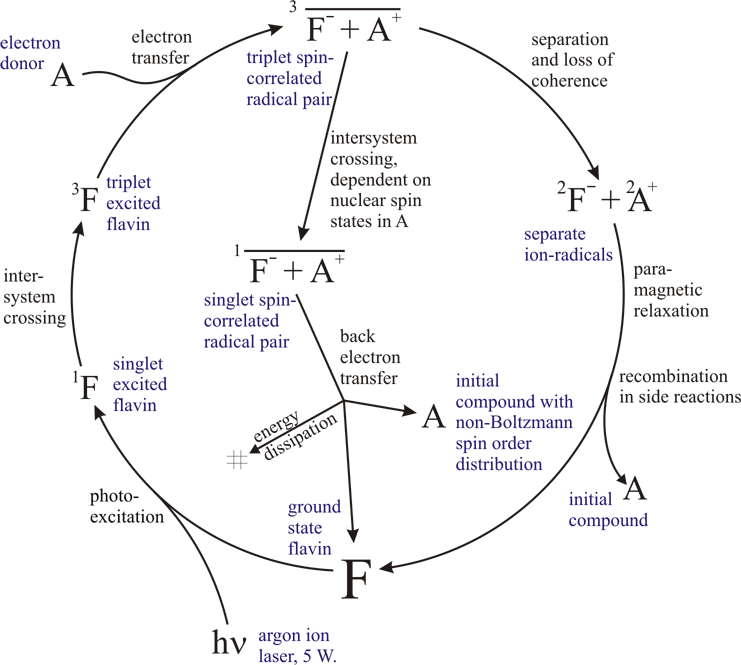
An example of Radical Pair Mechanism

The radical pair may either cross over to a singlet electron state and then recombine, or separate and perish in side reactions. The relative probability of these two pathways for a given radical pair depends on the nuclear spin state and leads to the nuclear spin state sorting and observable nuclear polarization.

== Applications ==
Detected as enhanced absorptive or emissive signals in the NMR spectra of the reaction products, CIDNP has been exploited for the last 30 years to characterise transient free radicals and their reaction mechanisms. In certain cases, CIDNP also offers the possibility of large improvements in NMR sensitivity. The principal application of this photo-CIDNP technique, as devised by Kaptein in 1978, has been to proteins in which the aromatic amino acid residues histidine, tryptophan and tyrosine can be polarized using flavins or other aza-aromatics as photosensitisers. The key feature of the method is that only solvent accessible histidine, tryptophan and tyrosine residues can undergo the radical pair reactions that result in nuclear polarization. Photo-CIDNP has thus been used to probe the surface structure of proteins, both in native and partially folded states, and their interactions with molecules that modify the accessibility of the reactive side chains.

Although usually observed in liquids, the photo-CIDNP effect has also been detected in solid state, for example on ^{13}C and ^{15}N nuclei in photosynthetic reaction centres, where significant nuclear polarization can accumulate as a result of spin selection processes in the electron transfer reactions.

== See also ==
- Dynamic nuclear polarisation
- Electron paramagnetic resonance
- Magnetoreception – a sense in birds that appears to rely on a radical pair mechanism
