= Position and momentum spaces =

Physical spaces representing position and momentum, Fourier-transform duals

In physics and geometry, there are two closely related vector spaces, usually three-dimensional but in general of any finite dimension. Position space (also called a coordinate space or a real coordinate space) is the set of all position vectors r in Euclidean space, and has dimensions of length; a position vector defines a point in space. (If the position vector of a point particle varies with time, it will trace out a path, the trajectory of a particle.) Momentum space is the set of all momentum vectors p a physical system can have; the momentum vector of a particle corresponds to its motion, with dimension of mass⋅length⋅time^{−1}.

Mathematically, the duality between position and momentum is an example of Pontryagin duality. In particular, if a function is given in position space, f(r), then its Fourier transform obtains the function in momentum space, φ(p). Conversely, the inverse Fourier transform of a momentum space function is a position space function.

These quantities and ideas transcend all of classical and quantum physics, and a physical system can be described using either the positions of the constituent particles, or their momenta, both formulations equivalently provide the same information about the system in consideration. Another quantity is useful to define in the context of waves. The wave vector k (or simply "k-vector") has dimensions of reciprocal length, making it an analogue of angular frequency ω which has dimensions of reciprocal time. The set of all wave vectors is k-space. Usually, the position vector r is more intuitive and simpler than the wave vector k, though the converse can also be true, such as in solid-state physics.

Quantum mechanics provides two fundamental examples of the duality between position and momentum, the Heisenberg uncertainty principle ΔxΔp ≥ ħ/2 stating that position and momentum cannot be simultaneously known to arbitrary precision, and the de Broglie relation p = ħk which states the momentum and wavevector of a free particle are proportional to each other. In this context, when it is unambiguous, the terms "momentum" and "wavevector" are used interchangeably. However, the de Broglie relation is not true in a crystal.

== Classical mechanics ==
=== Lagrangian mechanics ===
Most often in Lagrangian mechanics, the Lagrangian L(q, dq/dt, t) is in configuration space, where q = (q_{1}, q_{2},..., q_{n}) is an n-tuple of the generalized coordinates. The Euler–Lagrange equations of motion are
$$\frac{d}{dt}\frac{\partial L}{\partial \dot{q}_i} = \frac{\partial L}{\partial q_i} \,,\quad \dot{q}_i \equiv \frac{dq_i}{dt}\,.$$

(One overdot indicates one time derivative). Introducing the definition of canonical momentum for each generalized coordinate
$$p_i = \frac{\partial L}{\partial \dot{q}_i} \,,$$
the Euler–Lagrange equations take the form
$$\dot{p}_i = \frac{\partial L}{\partial q_i} \,.$$

The Lagrangian can be expressed in momentum space also, L′(p, dp/dt, t), where p = (p_{1}, p_{2}, ..., p_{n}) is an n-tuple of the generalized momenta. A Legendre transformation is performed to change the variables in the total differential of the generalized coordinate space Lagrangian;
$$dL = \sum_{i=1}^n \left(\frac{\partial L }{\partial q_i}dq_i + \frac{\partial L }{\partial \dot{q}_i}d\dot{q}_i\right) + \frac{\partial L }{\partial t}dt = \sum_{i=1}^n (\dot{p}_i dq_i + p_i d\dot{q}_i ) + \frac{\partial L }{\partial t}dt  \,,$$
where the definition of generalized momentum and Euler–Lagrange equations have replaced the partial derivatives of L. The product rule for differentials (Note: For two functions u and v, the differential of the product is d(uv) = udv + vdu.) allows the exchange of differentials in the generalized coordinates and velocities for the differentials in generalized momenta and their time derivatives,
$$\dot{p}_i dq_i = d(q_i\dot{p}_i) - q_i d\dot{p}_i$$
$$p_i d\dot{q}_i = d(\dot{q}_i p_i) - \dot{q}_i d p_i$$
which after substitution simplifies and rearranges to
$$d\left[L - \sum_{i=1}^n(q_i\dot{p}_i + \dot{q}_i p_i)\right] = -\sum_{i=1}^n (\dot{q}_i d p_i + q_i d\dot{p}_i )  + \frac{\partial L }{\partial t}dt \,.$$

Now, the total differential of the momentum space Lagrangian L′ is
$$dL' = \sum_{i=1}^n \left(\frac{\partial L'}{\partial p_i}dp_i + \frac{\partial L'}{\partial \dot{p}_i}d\dot{p}_i\right) + \frac{\partial L' }{\partial t}dt$$
so by comparison of differentials of the Lagrangians, the momenta, and their time derivatives, the momentum space Lagrangian L′ and the generalized coordinates derived from L′ are respectively
$$L' = L - \sum_{i=1}^n(q_i\dot{p}_i + \dot{q}_i p_i)\,,\quad -\dot{q}_i = \frac{\partial L'}{\partial p_i}\,,\quad -q_i = \frac{\partial L'}{\partial \dot{p}_i} \,.$$

Combining the last two equations gives the momentum space Euler–Lagrange equations
$$\frac{d}{dt}\frac{\partial L'}{\partial \dot{p}_i} = \frac{\partial L'}{\partial p_i} \,.$$

The advantage of the Legendre transformation is that the relation between the new and old functions and their variables are obtained in the process. Both the coordinate and momentum forms of the equation are equivalent and contain the same information about the dynamics of the system. This form may be more useful when momentum or angular momentum enters the Lagrangian.

=== Hamiltonian mechanics ===
In Hamiltonian mechanics, unlike Lagrangian mechanics which uses either all the coordinates or the momenta, the Hamiltonian equations of motion place coordinates and momenta on equal footing. For a system with Hamiltonian H(q, p, t), the equations are
$$\dot{q}_i = \frac{\partial H}{\partial p_i} \,,\quad \dot{p}_i = - \frac{\partial H}{\partial q_i} \,.$$

== Quantum mechanics ==
In quantum mechanics, a particle is described by a quantum state. This quantum state can be represented as a superposition of basis states. In principle one is free to choose the set of basis states, as long as they span the state space. If one chooses the (generalized) eigenfunctions of the position operator as a set of basis functions, one speaks of a state as a wave function ψ(r) in position space. The familiar Schrödinger equation in terms of the position r is an example of quantum mechanics in the position representation.

By choosing the eigenfunctions of a different operator as a set of basis functions, one can arrive at a number of different representations of the same state. If one picks the eigenfunctions of the momentum operator as a set of basis functions, the resulting wave function $\phi(\mathbf{k})$ is said to be the wave function in momentum space.

A feature of quantum mechanics is that phase spaces can come in different types: discrete-variable, rotor, and continuous-variable. The table below summarizes some relations involved in the three types of phase spaces.

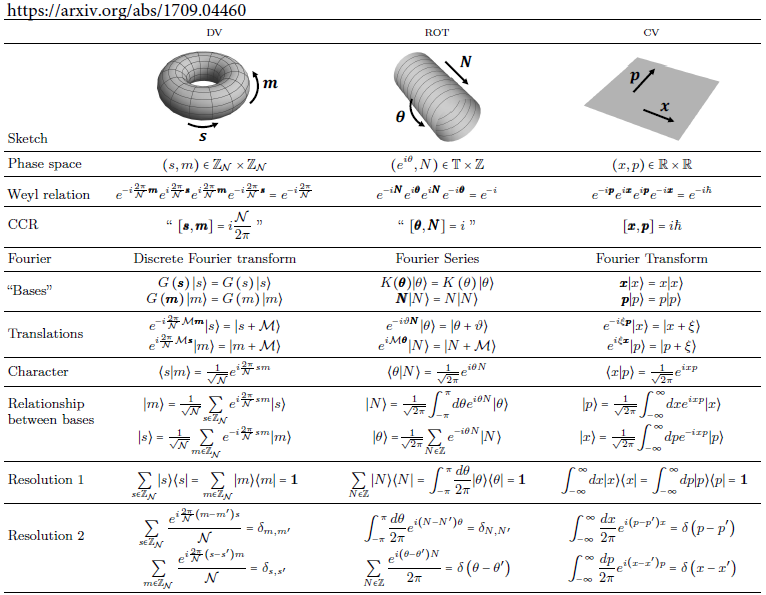
Comparison and summary of relations between conjugate variables in discrete-variable (DV), rotor (ROT), and continuous-variable (CV) phase spaces (taken from arXiv:1709.04460). Most physically relevant phase spaces consist of combinations of these three. Each phase space consists of position and momentum, whose possible values are taken from a locally compact Abelian group and its dual. A quantum mechanical state can be fully represented in terms of either variables, and the transformation used to go between position and momentum spaces is, in each of the three cases, a variant of the Fourier transform. The table uses bra-ket notation as well as mathematical terminology describing Canonical commutation relations (CCR).

== Reciprocal relation ==
The momentum representation of a wave function and the de Broglie relation are closely related to the Fourier inversion theorem and the concept of frequency domain. Since a free particle has a spatial frequency $k = |\mathbf{k}|= 2\pi/\lambda$ proportional to the momentum $p=|\mathbf{p}|=\hbar k$, describing the particle as a sum of frequency components is equivalent to describing it as the Fourier transform of a "sufficiently nice" wave function in momentum space.

=== Position space ===
Suppose we have a three-dimensional wave function in position space ψ(r), then we can write this functions as a weighted sum of orthogonal basis functions ψ_{j}(r):
$$\psi(\mathbf{r})=\sum_j \phi_j \psi_j(\mathbf{r})$$
or, in the continuous case, as an integral
$$\psi(\mathbf{r})=\int_{\mathbf{k}\text{-space}} \phi(\mathbf{k}) \psi_{\mathbf{k}}(\mathbf{r}) \mathrm d^3\mathbf{k}$$
It is clear that if we specify the set of functions $\psi_{\mathbf{k}}(\mathbf{r})$, say as the set of eigenfunctions of the momentum operator, the function $\phi(\mathbf{k})$ holds all the information necessary to reconstruct ψ(r) and is therefore an alternative description for the state $\psi$.

In coordinate representation the momentum operator is given by
$$\mathbf{\hat p} = -i \hbar\frac{\partial}{\partial \mathbf{r}}$$
(see matrix calculus for the denominator notation) with appropriate domain. The eigenfunctions are
$$\psi_{\mathbf{k}}(\mathbf{r})=\frac{1}{(\sqrt{2\pi})^3} e^{i \mathbf{k}\cdot\mathbf{r}}$$
and eigenvalues ħk. So
$$\psi(\mathbf{r})=\frac{1}{(\sqrt{2\pi})^3} \int_{\mathbf{k}\text{-space}} \phi(\mathbf{k}) e^{i \mathbf{k}\cdot\mathbf{r}} \mathrm d^3\mathbf{k}$$
and we see that the momentum representation is related to the position representation by a Fourier transform.

=== Momentum space ===
Conversely, a three-dimensional wave function in momentum space $\phi(\mathbf{k})$ can be expressed as a weighted sum of orthogonal basis functions $\phi_j(\mathbf{k})$,
$$\phi(\mathbf{k}) = \sum_j \psi_j \phi_j(\mathbf{k}),$$
or as an integral,
$$\phi(\mathbf{k}) = \int_{\mathbf{r}\text{-space}} \psi(\mathbf{r}) \phi_{\mathbf{r}}(\mathbf{k}) \mathrm d^3\mathbf{r}.$$

In momentum representation the position operator is given by
$$\mathbf{\hat r} = i \hbar\frac{\partial}{\partial \mathbf p} = i\frac{\partial}{\partial \mathbf{k}}$$
with eigenfunctions
$$\phi_{\mathbf{r}}(\mathbf{k}) = \frac{1}{\left(\sqrt{2\pi}\right)^3} e^{-i \mathbf{k}\cdot\mathbf{r}}$$
and eigenvalues r. So a similar decomposition of $\phi(\mathbf{k})$ can be made in terms of the eigenfunctions of this operator, which turns out to be the inverse Fourier transform,
$$\phi(\mathbf{k})=\frac{1}{(\sqrt{2\pi})^3} \int_{\mathbf{r}\text{-space}} \psi(\mathbf{r}) e^{-i \mathbf{k}\cdot\mathbf{r}} \mathrm d^3\mathbf{r} .$$

=== Unitary equivalence ===
The position and momentum operators are unitarily equivalent, with the unitary operator being given explicitly by the Fourier transform, namely a quarter-cycle rotation in phase space, generated by the oscillator Hamiltonian. Thus, they have the same spectrum. In physical language, p acting on momentum space wave functions is the same as r acting on position space wave functions (under the image of the Fourier transform).

== Reciprocal space and crystals ==
For an electron (or other particle) in a crystal, its value of k relates almost always to its crystal momentum, not its normal momentum. Therefore, k and p are not simply proportional but play different roles. See k·p perturbation theory for an example. Crystal momentum is like a wave envelope that describes how the wave varies from one unit cell to the next, but does not give any information about how the wave varies within each unit cell.

When k relates to crystal momentum instead of true momentum, the concept of k-space is still meaningful and extremely useful, but it differs in several ways from the non-crystal k-space discussed above. For example, in a crystal's k-space, there is an infinite set of points called the reciprocal lattice which are "equivalent" to k = 0 (this is analogous to aliasing). Likewise, the "first Brillouin zone" is a finite volume of k-space, such that every possible k is "equivalent" to exactly one point in this region.

== See also ==
- Phase space
- Reciprocal space
- Configuration space
- Fractional Fourier transform
