= Renninger =

Renninger is a surname. Notable people with the surname include:

- George Renninger, inventor of candy corn
- John Renninger (1924–2005), American politician
- Louis Renninger (1841–1908), American soldier
- Mauritius Renninger (1905–1987), German theoretical physicist
  - Renninger negative-result experiment
