= Interaction-free measurement =

Non-invasive measurement of a quantum system

In physics, interaction-free measurement is a type of measurement in quantum mechanics that detects the position, presence, or state of an object without an interaction occurring between it and the measuring device. Examples include the Renninger negative-result experiment, the Elitzur–Vaidman bomb-testing problem, and certain double-cavity optical systems, such as Hardy's paradox.

In quantum computation such measurements are referred to as counterfactual quantum computation, an idea introduced by physicists Graeme Mitchinson and Richard Jozsa. Examples include Keith Bowden's Counterfactual Mirror Array, describing a digital computer that could be counterfactually interrogated to calculate whether a light beam would fail to pass through a maze.

Initially proposed as thought experiments by R. H. Dicke in 1981 , interaction-free measurements have been experimentally demonstrated in various configurations.

Interaction-free measurements have also been proposed as a way to reduce sample damage in electron microscopy.

== Counterfactual quantum communication ==
In 2012 the idea of counterfactual quantum communication has been proposed and demonstrated. Its first achievement was reported in 2017. According to contemporary conceptions of counterfactual quantum communication, information can thereby be exchanged without any physical particle / matter / energy being transferred between the parties, without quantum teleportation and without the information being the absence of a signal. In 2020 research suggested that this is based on some form of relation between the properties of modular angular momentum with massless current of modular angular momentum current crossing the "transmission channel" with their interpretation's explanation not being based on "spooky action at a distance" but properties of a particle being able to "travel locally through regions from which the particle itself is excluded".

== See also ==
- Counterfactual quantum computation
- Counterfactual definiteness
- Quantum nondemolition measurement

== Bibliography ==
1. Renninger, M. (1960). "Messungen ohne Störung des Meßobjekts" [Observations without disturbing the object]. Zeitschrift für Physik (in German). 158 (4). Springer Science and Business Media LLC: 417–421. Bibcode:1960ZPhy..158..417R. doi:10.1007/bf01327019. ISSN 1434-6001. S2CID 123027469.
2. Renninger, M. (1953). "Zum Wellen-Korpuskel-Dualismus". Zeitschrift für Physik (in German). 136 (3). Springer Science and Business Media LLC: 251–261. Bibcode:1953ZPhy..136..251R. doi:10.1007/bf01325679. ISSN 1434-6001. S2CID 123122734.
3. Louis de Broglie, The Current Interpretation of Wave Mechanics, (1964) Elsevier, Amsterdam. (Provides discussion of the Renninger experiment.)
4. Dicke, R. H. (1981). "Interaction-free quantum measurements: A paradox?". American Journal of Physics. 49 (10). American Association of Physics Teachers (AAPT): 925–930. Bibcode:1981AmJPh..49..925D. doi:10.1119/1.12592. ISSN 0002-9505. (Provides a recent discussion of the Renninger experiment).
5. Cramer, John G. (1986-07-01). "The transactional interpretation of quantum mechanics". Reviews of Modern Physics. 58 (3). American Physical Society (APS): 647–687. Bibcode:1986RvMP...58..647C. doi:10.1103/revmodphys.58.647. ISSN 0034-6861. Archived from the original on 2005-12-20. (Section 4.1 reviews Renninger's experiment).
6. Paul G. Kwiat, The Tao of Quantum Interrogation, (2001).
7. Sean M. Carroll, Quantum Interrogation, (2006).
