= Counterfactual (disambiguation) =

Counterfactual is counterfactual conditional, a conditional containing an if-clause which is contrary to fact.

Counterfactual may also refer to:

== Arts and social science ==
- Counterfactual thinking, in psychology
- Counterfactual thought experiments, in philosophy, science, etc.
- Counterfactual history, in historiography
- Alternate history, a literary genre
- Counterfactual subjunctive, grammatical forms which in English are known as the past and pluperfect forms of the English subjunctive mood

== Physics ==
- Counterfactual definiteness, in quantum theory
  - Elitzur–Vaidman bomb tester, in quantum theory (counterfactual measurements)
