= Translation operator =

Translation operator can refer to these things:

- Translation operator (quantum mechanics)
- Shift operator, which effects a geometric translation
  - Translation (geometry)
- Displacement operator in quantum optics
