= Position operator =

Operator in quantum mechanics

In quantum mechanics, the position operator is the operator that corresponds to the position observable of a particle.

When the position operator is considered with a wide enough domain (e.g. the space of tempered distributions), its eigenvalues are the possible position vectors of the particle.

In one dimension, if by the symbol
$$| x \rangle$$
we denote the unitary eigenvector of the position operator corresponding to the eigenvalue $x$, then, $|x \rangle$ represents the state of the particle in which we know with certainty to find the particle itself at position $x$.

Therefore, denoting the position operator by the symbol $X$ we can write
$$X| x\rangle = x |x\rangle,$$
for every real position $x$.

One possible realization of the unitary state with position $x$ is the Dirac delta (function) distribution centered at the position $x$, often denoted by $\delta_x$.

In quantum mechanics, the ordered (continuous) family of all Dirac distributions, i.e. the family
$$\delta = (\delta_x)_{x \in \R},$$
is called the (unitary) position basis, just because it is a (unitary) eigenbasis of the position operator $X$ in the space of tempered distributions.

It is fundamental to observe that there exists only one linear continuous operator $X$ on the space of tempered distributions to itself, such that
$$X(\delta_x) = x \delta_x,$$
for every real point $x$. It is possible to prove that the unique operator $X$ is necessarily defined by
$$X(\psi) = \mathrm x \psi,$$
for every tempered distribution $\psi$, where $\mathrm x$ denotes the coordinate function of the position line – defined as the inclusion of the real line into the complex plane i.e
$$\mathrm x : \Reals \to \Complex : x \mapsto x .$$

== Introduction ==
Consider representing the quantum state of a particle at a certain instant of time by a square integrable wave function $\psi$. For now, assume one space dimension (i.e. the particle "confined to" a straight line). If the wave function is normalized, then the square modulus
$$|\psi|^2 = \psi^* \psi ,$$
represents the probability density of finding the particle at some position $x$ of the real-line, at a certain time. That is, if
$$\|\psi\|^2 = \int_{-\infty}^{+\infty} |\psi|^2 d \mathrm x = 1,$$
then the probability to find the particle in the position range $[a,b]$ is
$$\pi_X (\psi)([a,b]) =\int_a^b |\psi|^2 d \mathrm x .$$

Hence the expected value of a measurement of the position $X$ for the particle is
$$\langle X \rangle_{\psi} = \int_\R \mathrm x |\psi|^2 d \mathrm x = \int_\R \psi^* (\mathrm x \psi) \, d \mathrm x= \langle \psi | X(\psi) \rangle,$$
where $\mathrm x$ is the coordinate function
$$\mathrm x : \Reals \to \Complex : x \mapsto x ,$$
which is simply the canonical embedding of the position-line into the complex plane.

Strictly speaking, the observable position $X =\hat{\mathrm x}$ can be point-wisely defined as
$$\left(\hat{\mathrm x} \psi\right) (x) = x\psi(x) ,$$
for every wave function $\psi$ and for every point $x$ of the real line. In the case of equivalence classes $\psi \in L^2$ the definition reads directly as follows
$$\hat{\mathrm x} \psi = \mathrm x \psi , \quad \forall \psi \in L^2.$$
That is, the position operator $X$ multiplies any wave-function $\psi$ by the coordinate function $\mathrm x$.

=== Three dimensions ===
The generalisation to three dimensions is straightforward.

The space-time wavefunction is now $\psi(\mathbf{r}, t)$ and the expectation value of the position operator $\hat \mathbf{r}$ at the state $\psi$ is
$$\left\langle \hat \mathbf{r} \right\rangle _\psi = \int \mathbf{r} |\psi|^2 d^3 \mathbf{r}$$
where the integral is taken over all space. The position operator is
$$\mathbf{\hat{r}}\psi = \mathbf{r}\psi.$$

== Basic properties ==
In the above definition, which regards the case of a particle confined upon a line, the careful reader may remark that there does not exist any clear specification of the domain and the co-domain for the position operator. In literature, more or less explicitly, we find essentially three main directions to address this issue.

1. The position operator is defined on the subspace $D_X$ of $L^2$ formed by those equivalence classes $\psi$ whose product by the embedding $\mathrm x$ lives in the space $L^2$. In this case the position operator
  $$X : D_X \subset L^2 \to L^2 : \psi \mapsto \mathrm x \psi$$
  reveals not continuous (unbounded with respect to the topology induced by the canonical scalar product of $L^2$), with no eigenvectors, no eigenvalues and consequently with empty point spectrum.
2. The position operator is defined on the Schwartz space $\mathcal S$ (i.e. the nuclear space of all smooth complex functions defined upon the real-line whose derivatives are rapidly decreasing). In this case the position operator
  $$X : \mathcal S \subset L^2  \to \mathcal S \subset L^2  : \psi \mapsto \mathrm x \psi$$
  reveals continuous (with respect to the canonical topology of $\mathcal S$), injective, with no eigenvectors, no eigenvalues and consequently with empty point spectrum. It is (fully) self-adjoint with respect to the scalar product of $L^2$ in the sense that
  $$\langle X (\psi)|\phi\rangle = \langle \psi|X(\phi)\rangle, \quad \forall \psi,\phi \in \mathcal S.$$
3. The position operator is defined on the dual space $\mathcal S^\times$ of $\mathcal S$ (i.e. the nuclear space of tempered distributions). As $L^2$ is a subspace of $\mathcal S^\times$, the product of a tempered distribution by the embedding $\mathrm x$ always lives $\mathcal S^\times$. In this case the position operator
  $$X : \mathcal S^\times \to \mathcal S^\times : \psi \mapsto \mathrm x \psi$$
  reveals continuous (with respect to the canonical topology of $\mathcal S^\times$), surjective, endowed with complete families of generalized eigenvectors and real generalized eigenvalues. It is self-adjoint with respect to the scalar product of $L^2$ in the sense that its transpose operator
  $${}^tX : \mathcal S \to \mathcal S : \phi \mapsto \mathrm x \phi ,$$
  is self-adjoint, that is
  $$\left\langle\left. \,{}^tX (\phi)\right|\psi \right\rangle = \left\langle \phi| \,{}^tX(\psi)\right\rangle, \quad \forall \psi,\phi \in \mathcal S.$$

The last case is, in practice, the most widely adopted choice in Quantum Mechanics literature, although never explicitly underlined. It addresses the possible absence of eigenvectors by extending the Hilbert space to a rigged Hilbert space:
$$\mathcal S \subset L^2 \subset \mathcal S^\times,$$
thereby providing a mathematically rigorous notion of eigenvectors and eigenvalues.

== Eigenstates ==
The eigenfunctions of the position operator (on the space of tempered distributions), represented in position space, are Dirac delta functions.

Informal proof. To show that possible eigenvectors of the position operator should necessarily be Dirac delta distributions, suppose that $\psi$ is an eigenstate of the position operator with eigenvalue $x_0$. We write the eigenvalue equation in position coordinates,
$$\hat{\mathrm x}\psi(x) = \mathrm x \psi(x) = x_0 \psi(x)$$
recalling that $\hat{\mathrm x}$ simply multiplies the wave-functions by the function $\mathrm x$, in the position representation. Since the function $\mathrm x$ is variable while $x_0$ is a constant, $\psi$ must be zero everywhere except at the point $x_0$. Clearly, no continuous function satisfies such properties, and we cannot simply define the wave-function to be a complex number at that point because its $L^2$-norm would be 0 and not 1. This suggest the need of a "functional object" concentrated at the point $x_0$ and with integral different from 0: any multiple of the Dirac delta centered at $x_0$. The normalized solution to the equation
$$\mathrm x \psi = x_0 \psi$$
is
$$\psi(x) = \delta(x - x_0),$$
or better
$$\psi = \delta _{x_0},$$
such that
$$\mathrm x \delta_{x_0} = x_0 \delta_{x_0} .$$
Indeed, recalling that the product of any function by the Dirac distribution centered at a point is the value of the function at that point times the Dirac distribution itself, we obtain immediately
$$\mathrm x \delta_{x_0} = \mathrm x (x_0) \delta_{x_0} =x_0 \delta_{x_0} .$$
Although such Dirac states are physically unrealizable and, strictly speaking, are not functions, the Dirac distribution centered at $x_0$ can be thought of as an "ideal state" whose position is known exactly (any measurement of the position always returns the eigenvalue $x_0$). Hence, by the uncertainty principle, nothing is known about the momentum of such a state.

== Momentum space ==
Usually, in quantum mechanics, by representation in the momentum space we intend the representation of states and observables with respect to the canonical unitary momentum basis
$$\eta = \left(\left[
(2\pi\hbar)^{-\frac{1}{2}} e^{(\iota/\hbar) (\mathrm x|p)}\right]\right)
_{p \in \R}.$$

In momentum space, the position operator in one dimension is represented by the following differential operator
$$\left(\hat{\mathrm x}\right)_P = i\hbar\frac{d}{d \mathrm p} = i\frac{d}{d \mathrm k},$$

where:

- the representation of the position operator in the momentum basis is naturally defined by $\left(\hat{\mathrm x}\right)_P (\psi)_P = \left(\hat{\mathrm x}\psi\right)_P$, for every wave function (tempered distribution) $\psi$;
- $\mathrm p$ represents the coordinate function on the momentum line and the wave-vector function $\mathrm k$ is defined by $\mathrm k = \mathrm p / \hbar$.

== Formalism in L^{2}(R, C) ==
Consider the case of a spinless particle moving in one spatial dimension. The state space for such a particle contains $L^2(\Reals,\Complex)$; the Hilbert space of complex-valued, square-integrable functions on the real line.

The position operator is defined as the self-adjoint operator
$$Q : D_Q \to L^2(\Reals, \Complex) : \psi \mapsto \mathrm q \psi,$$
with domain of definition
$$D_Q = \left\{ \psi \in L^2(\R) \mid \mathrm q \psi \in L^2(\R) \right\},$$
and coordinate function $\mathrm q : \Reals \to \Complex$ sending each point $x \in \R$ to itself, such that
$$Q (\psi)(x) = x \psi (x) = \mathrm q(x) \psi (x),$$
for each pointwisely defined $\psi \in D_Q$ and $x \in \R$.

Immediately from the definition we can deduce that the spectrum consists of the entire real line and that $Q$ has a strictly continuous spectrum, i.e., no discrete set of eigenvalues.

The three-dimensional case is defined analogously. We shall keep the one-dimensional assumption in the following discussion.

== Measurement theory in L^{2}(R, C) ==
As with any quantum mechanical observable, in order to discuss position measurement, we need to calculate the spectral resolution of the position operator
$$X : D_X \to L^2(\Reals, \Complex) : \psi \mapsto \mathrm x \psi$$
which is
$$X = \int_\R \lambda \, d \mu_X(\lambda) = \int_\R \mathrm x \, \mu_X = \mu_X (\mathrm x),$$
where $\mu_X$ is the so-called spectral measure of the position operator.

Let $\chi _B$ denote the indicator function for a Borel subset $B$ of $\mathbb{R}$. Then the spectral measure is given by
$$\psi \mapsto \mu_X(B)(\psi) = \chi_B \psi ,$$
i.e., as multiplication by the indicator function of $B$.

Therefore, if the system is prepared in a state $\psi$, then the probability of the measured position of the particle belonging to a Borel set $B$ is
$$\|\mu_X(B)(\psi)\|^2 = \|\chi_B \psi\|^2 = \int_B |\psi|^2\ \mu =\pi_X(\psi)(B),$$
where $\mu$ is the Lebesgue measure on the real line.

After any measurement aiming to detect the particle within the subset B, the wave function collapses to either
$$\frac{\mu_X(B) \psi}{\|\mu_X(B) \psi \|} = \frac{\chi_B \psi}{\| \chi_B \psi \|}$$
or
$$\frac{(1 - \chi_B)\psi}{\|(1 - \chi_B)\psi\|},$$
where $\| \cdot \|$ is the Hilbert space norm on $L^2(\Reals, \Complex)$.

== See also ==
- Position and momentum space
- Momentum operator
- Translation operator (quantum mechanics)
