= Avshalom Elitzur =

Israeli physicist and philosopher (born 1957)

- אבשלום אליצור
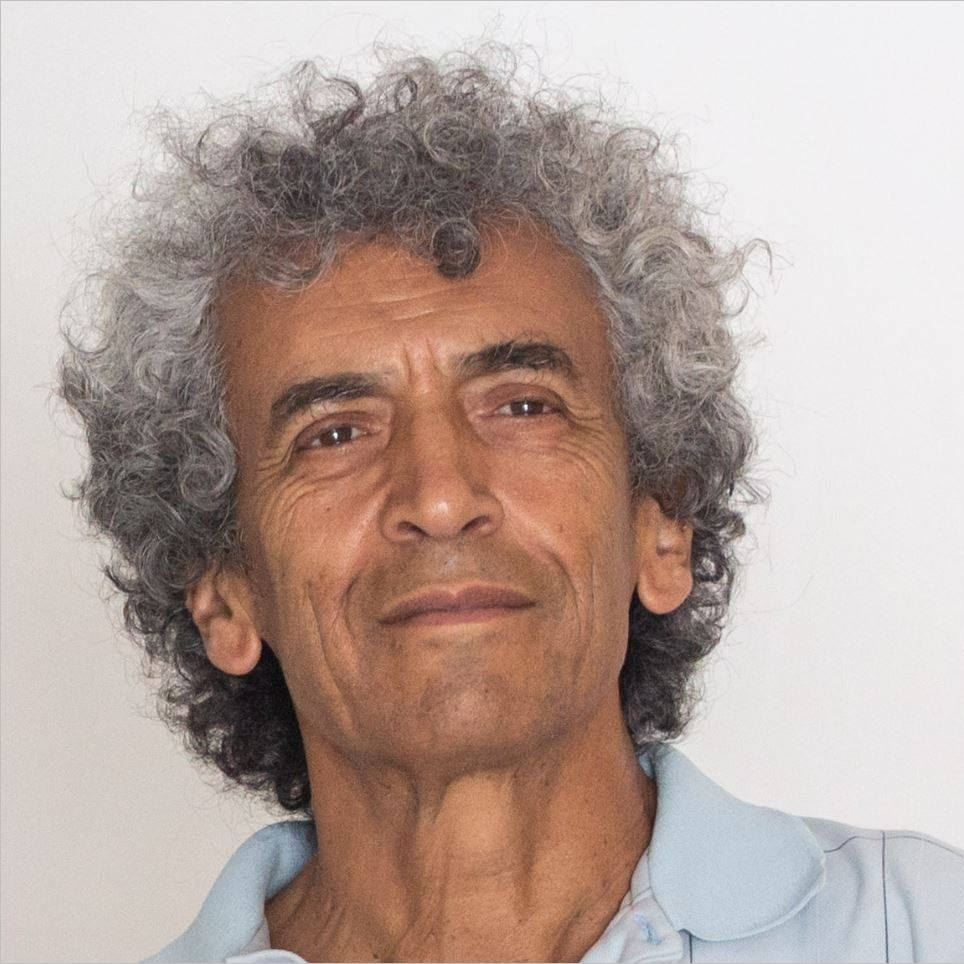
- Elitzur in 2019
- Born: May 31, 1957 (age 69); Pahlavi Iran
- Education: Tel Aviv University (Ph.D.)
- Known for: Elitzur–Vaidman bomb tester
- Awards: Noetic Medal (2010)
- Scientific career
- Fields: Quantum mechanics
- Workplaces: Weizmann Institute of Science; Tel Aviv University; Bar-Ilan University
- Thesis: Time's Passage and the Time-Asymmetries (1999)
- Doctoral advisor: Yakir Aharonov
- Website: www.avshalom-elitzur.academy

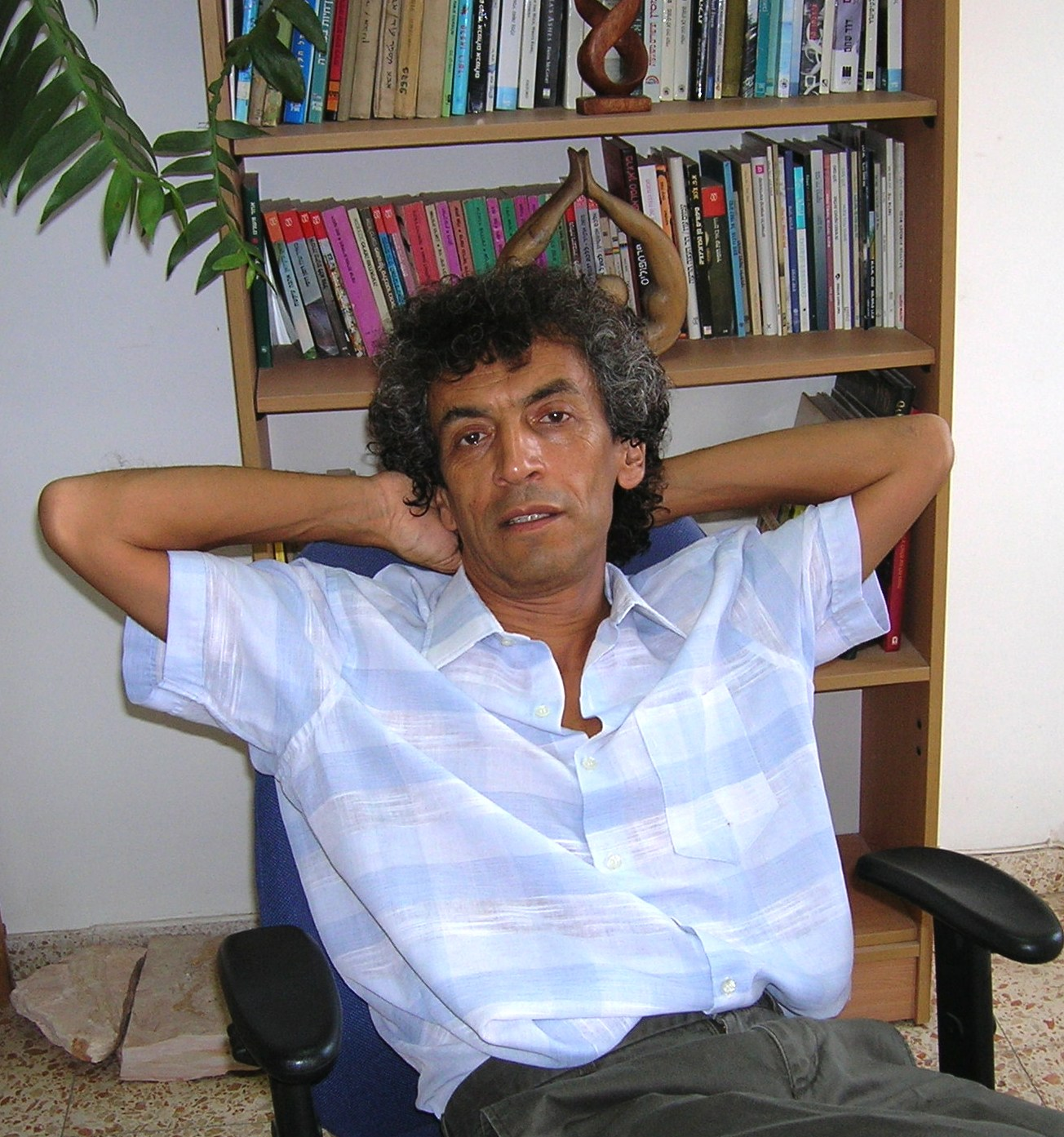
Avshalom Elitzur, 2009.

Avshalom Cyrus Elitzur (Hebrew: אבשלום כורש אליצור; born 30 May 1957), is an Iranian-born Israeli physicist and philosopher. He is known for the Elitzur–Vaidman bomb tester in quantum mechanics.

== Biography ==
Avshalom Elitzur was born in Kerman, Iran, to a Jewish family. When he was two years old, his family immigrated to Israel and settled in Rehovot. He left school at the age of sixteen and began working as a laboratory technician at the Weizmann Institute of Science in Rehovot. Elitzur received no formal university training before obtaining his PhD. Elitzur had a relationship with journalist Timura Lessinger, with whom he has a daughter.

== Academic career ==
Elitzur was a senior lecturer at the Unit for Interdisciplinary Studies, Bar-Ilan University, Ramat-Gan, Israel. He is noted for the Elitzur–Vaidman bomb tester experiment in quantum mechanics, which was publicised by Roger Penrose in his book Shadows of the Mind.

In 1987, he published Into the Holy of Holies: Psychoanalytic Insights into the Bible and Judaism. That year, he was invited to present an unpublished manuscript on quantum mechanics at an international conference in Temple University in Philadelphia. He was later invited by Yakir Aharonov of Tel Aviv University, to write a doctoral thesis on the subject. He was the chief editor of natural sciences in Encyclopaedia Hebraica. In 2008, he was a visiting professor at Joseph Fourier University.

Elitzur is the founder of Iyar, the Israeli Institute for Advanced Research.

== Award and recognitions ==
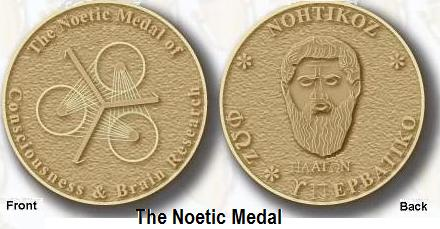
Noetic medal of Consciousness and Brain Research

In 2010, Elitzur won the Noetic Medal of Consciousness and Brain Research for his contributions to the cosmology of the mind and Quantum Theory.

== Published works ==
=== Author ===
- לפני ולפנים - עיונים פסיכואנליטיים במקרא וביהדות, תל אביב, "ירום"-אליצור, 1987
- זמן ותודעה - תהיות חדשות על חידות עתיקות, אוניברסיטה משודרת, 1994,

=== Editor ===
- 'Endophysics, Time, Quantum and the Subjective', edited by Rosolino Buccheri, Avshalom C Elitzur and Metod Saniga; Germany, Bielefeld, 2005 ISBN 978-981-256-509-9
- 'Quo Vadis Quantum Mechanics?' (The Frontiers Collection), by A. Elitzur (Editor), S. Dolev (Editor), N. Kolenda (Editor); New York: Springer, 2005 ISBN 3-540-22188-3
- 'Mind and its Place in the World: Phenomenology & Minds', Vol. 7 (Phenomenology & Mind) by Alexander Batthyany (Editor), Avshalom Elitzur (Editor), Ontos Verlag, 2006 ISBN 978-3-937202-98-3
- 'Irreducibly Conscious: Selected Papers on Consciousness', Herausgegeben von Batthyany, Alexander / Elitzur, Avshalom (Editors), Universitätsverlag Winter GmbH Heidelberg, 2009
