= Momentum operator =

Operator in quantum mechanics

In quantum mechanics, the momentum operator is the operator associated with the linear momentum. The momentum operator is, in the position representation, an example of a differential operator. For the case of one particle in one spatial dimension, the definition is:
$$\hat{p} = - i \hbar \frac{\partial}{\partial x}$$
where ħ is the reduced Planck constant, i the imaginary unit, x is the spatial coordinate, and a partial derivative (denoted by $\partial/\partial x$) is used instead of a total derivative (d/dx) since the wave function is also a function of time. The "hat" indicates an operator. The "application" of the operator on a differentiable wave function is as follows:
$$\hat{p}\psi = - i \hbar \frac{\partial \psi}{\partial x}$$

In a basis of Hilbert space consisting of momentum eigenstates expressed in the momentum representation, the action of the operator is simply multiplication by p, i.e. it is a multiplication operator, just as the position operator is a multiplication operator in the position representation. Note that the definition above is the canonical momentum, which is not gauge invariant and not a measurable physical quantity for charged particles in an electromagnetic field. In that case, the canonical momentum is not equal to the kinetic momentum.

At the time quantum mechanics was developed in the 1920s, the momentum operator was found by many theoretical physicists, including Niels Bohr, Arnold Sommerfeld, Erwin Schrödinger, and Eugene Wigner. Its existence and form is sometimes taken as one of the foundational postulates of quantum mechanics.

== Origin from de Broglie plane waves ==
The momentum and energy operators can be constructed in the following way.

=== One dimension ===
Starting in one dimension, using the plane wave solution to the Schrödinger equation of a single free particle,
$$\psi(x, t) = e^{\frac{i}{\hbar}(px - Et)},$$
where p is interpreted as momentum in the x-direction and E is the particle energy. The first order partial derivative with respect to space is
$$\frac{\partial \psi(x, t)}{\partial x} = \frac{ip}{\hbar} e^{\frac{i}{\hbar}(px - Et)} = \frac{ip}{\hbar} \psi.$$

This suggests the operator equivalence
$$\hat{p} = -i\hbar \frac{\partial }{\partial x}$$
so the momentum of the particle and the value that is measured when a particle is in a plane wave state is the (generalized) eigenvalue of the above operator.

Since the partial derivative is a linear operator, the momentum operator is also linear, and because any wave function can be expressed as a superposition of other states, when this momentum operator acts on the entire superimposed wave, it yields the momentum eigenvalues for each plane wave component. These new components then superimpose to form the new state, in general not a multiple of the old wave function.

=== Three dimensions ===
The derivation in three dimensions is the same, except the gradient operator del is used instead of one partial derivative. In three dimensions, the plane wave solution to the Schrödinger equation is:
$$\psi = e^{\frac{i}{\hbar}(\mathbf{p}\cdot\mathbf{r}-E t)}$$
and the gradient is
$$\begin{align}
\nabla \psi &= \mathbf{e}_x\frac{\partial \psi}{\partial x} + \mathbf{e}_y\frac{\partial \psi}{\partial y} + \mathbf{e}_z\frac{\partial \psi}{\partial z} \\
& = \frac{i}{\hbar} \left ( p_x\mathbf{e}_x + p_y\mathbf{e}_y+ p_z\mathbf{e}_z \right)\psi \\
& = \frac{i}{\hbar} \mathbf{p}\psi
\end{align}$$
where e_{x}, e_{y}, and e_{z} are the unit vectors for the three spatial dimensions, hence
$$\mathbf{\hat{p}} = -i \hbar \nabla$$

This momentum operator is in position space because the partial derivatives were taken with respect to the spatial variables.

== Definition (position space) ==
For a single particle with no electric charge and no spin, the momentum operator can be written in the position basis as:
$$\mathbf{\hat{p}}=-i\hbar\nabla$$
where ∇ is the gradient operator, ħ is the reduced Planck constant, and i is the imaginary unit.

In one spatial dimension, this becomes
$$\hat{p}=\hat{p}_x=-i\hbar{\partial \over \partial x}.$$

This is the expression for the canonical momentum. For a charged particle q in an electromagnetic field, during a gauge transformation, the position space wave function undergoes a local U(1) group transformation, and $\hat{p}\psi = - i \hbar \frac{\partial \psi}{\partial x}$ will change its value. Therefore, the canonical momentum is not gauge invariant, and hence not a measurable physical quantity.

The kinetic momentum, a gauge invariant physical quantity, can be expressed in terms of the canonical momentum, the scalar potential φ and vector potential A:
$$\mathbf{\hat{P}} = -i\hbar\nabla - q\mathbf{A}$$

The expression above is called minimal coupling. For electrically neutral particles, the canonical momentum is equal to the kinetic momentum.

== Properties ==
=== Hermiticity ===
The momentum operator can be described as a symmetric (i.e. Hermitian), unbounded operator acting on a dense subspace of the quantum state space. If the operator acts on a (normalizable) quantum state then the operator is self-adjoint. In physics the term Hermitian often refers to both symmetric and self-adjoint operators.

(In certain artificial situations, such as the quantum states on the semi-infinite interval [0, ∞), there is no way to make the momentum operator Hermitian. This is closely related to the fact that a semi-infinite interval cannot have translational symmetry—more specifically, it does not have unitary translation operators. See below.)

=== Canonical commutation relation ===
By applying the commutator to an arbitrary state in either the position or momentum basis, one can easily show that:
$$\left [ \hat{x}, \hat{p} \right ] = \hat{x} \hat{p} - \hat{p} \hat{x} = i \hbar  \mathbb{I},$$
where $\mathbb{I}$ is the unit operator. The Heisenberg uncertainty principle defines limits on how accurately the momentum and position of a single observable system can be known at once. In quantum mechanics, position and momentum are conjugate variables.

=== Fourier transform ===
The following discussion uses the bra–ket notation. One may write
$$\psi(x)=\langle x|\psi\rangle =\int\!\!dp~ \langle x|p\rangle \langle p|\psi\rangle = \int\!\!dp~ {e^{ixp/\hbar} \tilde \psi (p) \over \sqrt{2\pi\hbar}},$$
so the tilde represents the Fourier transform, in converting from coordinate space to momentum space. It then holds that
$$\hat{p}=   \int\!\!dp~      |  p    \rangle p \langle p|=   -i\hbar      \int\!\!dx~ |  x \rangle  \frac{ d}{d x} \langle x| ~,$$
that is, the momentum acting in coordinate space corresponds to spatial frequency,
$$\langle  x | \hat{p} | \psi \rangle = - i \hbar \frac{d}{dx} \psi ( x ) .$$

An analogous result applies for the position operator in the momentum basis,
$$\langle  p | \hat{x} | \psi \rangle =  i \hbar \frac{d}{dp} \psi ( p ),$$
leading to further useful relations,
$$\langle p | \hat{x} | p' \rangle = i \hbar \frac{d}{dp} \delta (p - p') ,$$
$$\langle x | \hat{p} | x' \rangle = -i \hbar \frac{d}{dx} \delta (x - x') ,$$
where δ stands for Dirac's delta function.

== Derivation from infinitesimal translations ==
The translation operator is denoted T(ε), where ε represents the length of the translation. It satisfies the following identity:
$$T(\varepsilon) | \psi \rangle =  \int dx T(\varepsilon) | x \rangle \langle x | \psi \rangle$$
that becomes
$$\int dx | x + \varepsilon \rangle \langle x |\psi \rangle = \int dx | x \rangle \langle x - \varepsilon | \psi \rangle = \int dx | x \rangle  \psi(x - \varepsilon)$$

Assuming the function $\psi$ to be analytic (i.e. differentiable in some domain of the complex plane), one may expand in a Taylor series about x:
$$\psi(x-\varepsilon) = \psi(x) - \varepsilon \frac{d \psi}{dx}$$
so for infinitesimal values of ε:
$$T(\varepsilon) = 1 - \varepsilon {d \over dx}  = 1 - {i \over \hbar} \varepsilon \left ( - i \hbar { d \over dx} \right )$$

As it is known from classical mechanics, the momentum is the generator of translation, so the relation between translation and momentum operators is:
$$T(\varepsilon) =  1 - \frac{i}{\hbar} \varepsilon \hat{p}$$
thus
$$\hat{p} = - i \hbar \frac{d}{dx}.$$

== 4-momentum operator ==
Inserting the 3d momentum operator above and the energy operator into the 4-momentum (as a 1-form with (+ − − −) metric signature):
$$P_\mu = \left(\frac{E}{c},-\mathbf{p}\right)$$
obtains the 4-momentum operator:
$$\hat{P}_\mu = \left(\frac{1}{c}\hat{E},-\mathbf{\hat{p}}\right) = i\hbar\left(\frac{1}{c} \frac{\partial}{\partial t}, \nabla\right) = i\hbar\partial_\mu$$
where ∂_{μ} is the 4-gradient, and the −iħ becomes +iħ preceding the 3-momentum operator. This operator occurs in relativistic quantum field theory, such as the Dirac equation and other relativistic wave equations, since energy and momentum combine into the 4-momentum vector above, momentum and energy operators correspond to space and time derivatives, and they need to be first order partial derivatives for Lorentz covariance.

The Dirac operator and Dirac slash of the 4-momentum is given by contracting with the gamma matrices:
$$\gamma^\mu\hat{P}_\mu = i\hbar \gamma^\mu\partial_\mu = \hat{P} = i\hbar\partial \!\!\!/$$

If the signature was (− + + +), the operator would be
$$\hat{P}_\mu = \left(-\frac{1}{c}\hat{E},\mathbf{\hat{p}}\right) = -i\hbar\left(\frac{1}{c}\frac{\partial}{\partial t},\nabla\right) = -i\hbar\partial_\mu$$
instead.

== See also ==
- Mathematical descriptions of the electromagnetic field
- Translation operator (quantum mechanics)
- Relativistic wave equations
- Pauli–Lubanski pseudovector
