= Mott problem =

Iconic quantum mechanics problem

The Mott problem is an iconic challenge to quantum mechanics theory: how can the prediction of spherically symmetric wave function result in linear tracks seen in a cloud chamber. The problem was first formulated in 1927 by Albert Einstein and Max Born and solved in 1929 by Nevill Francis Mott. Mott's solution notably only uses the wave equation, not wavefunction collapse, and it is considered the earliest example of what is now called decoherence theory.

== Spherical waves, particle tracks ==
The problem later associated with Mott concerns a spherical wave function associated with an alpha ray emitted from the decay of a radioactive atomic nucleus. Intuitively, one might think that such a wave function should randomly ionize atoms throughout the cloud chamber, but this is not the case. The result of such a decay is always observed as linear tracks seen in Wilson's cloud chamber. The origin of the tracks given the original spherical wave predicted by theory is the problem requiring physical explanation.

Spherical wave

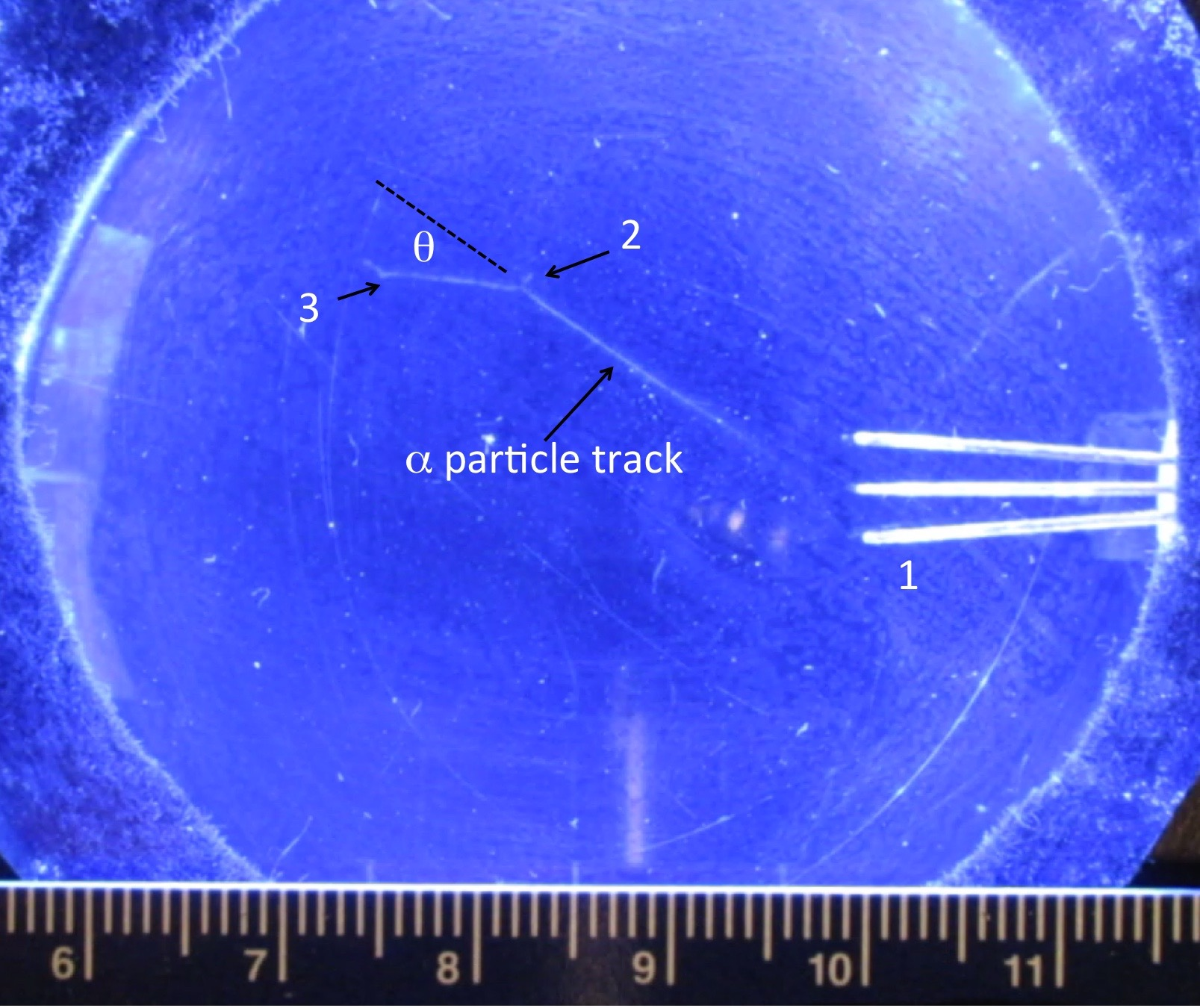
Alpha particle track in a cloud chamber

In practice, virtually all high-energy physics experiments, such as those conducted at particle colliders, involve wave functions which are inherently spherical. Yet, when the results of a particle collision are detected, they are invariably in the form of linear tracks (see, for example, the illustrations accompanying the article on bubble chambers). It is somewhat strange to think that a spherically symmetric wave function should be observed as a straight track, and yet, this occurs on a daily basis in all particle collider experiments.

== History ==
The problem of alpha particle track was discussed at the Fifth Solvay conference in 1927. Max Born described the problem as one that Albert Einstein pointed to, asking "how can the corpuscular character of the phenomenon be reconciled here with the representation by waves?". Born answers with Heisenberg's "reduction of the probability packet", now called wavefunction collapse, introduced in May 1927. Born says each droplet in the cloud chamber track corresponds to a reduction of the wave in the immediate vicinity of the droplet. At the suggestion of Wolfgang Pauli he also discusses a solution that includes the alpha emitter and two atoms all in the same state and without wave function collapse, but does not pursue the idea beyond a brief discussion.

In his highly influential 1930 book, Werner Heisenberg analyzed the problem qualitatively but in detail. He considers two cases: wavefunction collapse at each interaction or wavefunction collapse only at the final apparatus, concluding they are equivalent.

In 1929 Charles Galton Darwin analyzed the problem without using wavefunction collapse. He says the correct approach requires viewing the wavefunction as consisting of the system under study (the alpha particle) and the environment it interacts with (atoms of the cloud chamber). Starting with a simple spherical wave, each collision involves a wavefunction with more coordinates and increasing complexity. His model coincides with the strategy of modern quantum decoherence theory.

The Renninger negative-result experiment from the 1960s is a refinement of the Mott problem to further sharpen one of the paradoxes associated with wave-function collapse.

== Mott's analysis ==
Nevill Mott picks up where Darwin left off, citing Darwin's paper explicitly.

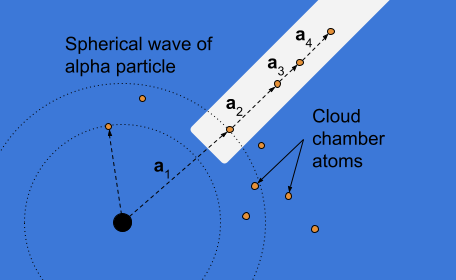
Schematic diagram of Nevill Mott's model for alpha particle excitation of bubbles in a cloud chamber

Mott's goal is to calculate the probability of exciting multiple atoms in the cloud chamber to understand why the excitation with a spherical wave creates a linear track. Mott starts with a spherical wave for the alpha particle and two representative cloud chamber atoms modeled as hydrogen atoms. The relative positions of the emitter (black dot in the diagram, taken as the origin in Mott's treatment) and the two atoms (orange dots at $\mathbf{a_1}$ and $\mathbf{a_2}$) are fixed during the calculation of the track, meaning the velocity of the alpha particle is taken as much larger than the thermal motion of the gas atoms. These relative coordinates are parameters in the solution so the intensity of the excitations for various positions can be compared. The hydrogen atoms stand in for whatever might compose the cloud chamber gas.

Given the fixed positions of the atoms, Mott calculates the excitation of the electrons of those atoms. By assuming that the emitter and the hydrogen atoms are not close together, Mott represents the time-independent part of the three-body state of the system, $F$, as a sum of products of hydrogen atom eigenfunctions $\psi_j$:

$$F(\mathbf{R}, \mathbf{r_1}, \mathbf{r_2}) = \sum_{{j_1},{j_2}}f_{j_1j_2}(\mathbf{R})\psi_{j_1}^{I}(\mathbf{r_1}-\mathbf{a_1})\psi_{j_2}^{II}(\mathbf{r_2}-\mathbf{a_2})$$

Here $\mathbf{R}$ is the position of the alpha particle, $\mathbf{r_1}, \mathbf{r_2}$ the positions of the hydrogen atoms' electrons, and the sum runs over the excited states of the atoms I and II. The expansion factors $f_{j_1j_2}(\mathbf{R})$ have the physical interpretation of conditional probability for the alpha particle near $\mathbf{R}$, given that atom I is excited to state $j_1$ and atom II is excited to state $j_2$.

To solve for the expansion factors, Mott used the Born approximation, a form of perturbation theory for scattering that works well when the incident wave is not significantly altered by the scattering. Consequently, Mott is assuming that the alpha particle barely notices the atoms it excites as it races through the cloud chamber.

Mott analyzes the spatial properties of the factor $f_{j_10}(\mathbf{R})$ which describes the scattered alpha-particle wave when the first atom is excited and the second is in its ground state. He shows that it is strongly peaked along the line from the emitter to the first atom (along $\mathbf{a}_1$ in the diagram). Mott then shows that the probability that both atoms become excited depends on the product of the probability that one atom is excited $f_{j_10}(\mathbf{R})$ and the spatial extent of the electron potential of the other atom. Both atoms are excited only for colinear configurations.

Mott demonstrated that by considering the interaction in configuration space, where all of the atoms of the cloud chamber play a role, it is overwhelmingly probable that all of the condensed droplets in the cloud chamber will lie close to the same straight line. In his work on quantum measurement, Eugene Wigner cites Mott's insight on configuration space as a critical aspect of quantum mechanics: the configuration space approach allows spatial correlations like the line of atoms into the structure of quantum mechanics. What is uncertain is which straight line the wave packet will reduce to; the probability distribution of straight tracks is spherically symmetric.

== Modern applications ==
Erich Joos and H. Dieter Zeh adopt Mott's model in the first concrete model of quantum decoherence theory. Mott's analysis, while it predates modern decoherence theory, fits squarely within its approach. Bryce DeWitt points to the dramatic mass difference between the alpha particle and the electrons in Mott's analysis as characteristic of decoherence of the state of the more massive system, the alpha particle.

In modern times, the Mott problem is occasionally considered theoretically in the context of astrophysics and cosmology, where the evolution of the wave function from the Big Bang or other astrophysical phenomena is considered.

== See also ==
- Alpha particles – Ionizing radiation particle of two protons and two neutrons
- History of quantum mechanics
- Quantum state space – Mathematical space representing physical quantum systems
- Scattering amplitude – Probability amplitude in quantum scattering theory
- Trajectory – Path of a moving object
