= Counterfactual definiteness =

Concept in quantum mechanics

Because of the importance of the observer effect and other factors, counterfactual definiteness (CFD) is an open question in quantum mechanics. Whether experts working in the field can speak "meaningfully" of the definiteness of the results of measurements that have not been performed is not known for certain. Theorists often assume definitely that various objects exist and that objects have certain properties, but under a counterfactual scenario (i.e., when no measurement is made), the scientific principles at work don't apply as cleanly, and such assumptions are not as solid as under rigorous experimental conditions. The term "counterfactual definiteness" is used in discussions of physics calculations, especially those related to the phenomenon called quantum entanglement and those related to the Bell inequalities. In such discussions "meaningfully" means the ability to treat these unmeasured results on an equal footing with measured results in statistical calculations. It is this (sometimes assumed but unstated) aspect of counterfactual definiteness that is of direct relevance to physics and mathematical models of physical systems and not philosophical concerns regarding the meaning of unmeasured results.

== Overview ==
The subject of counterfactual definiteness receives attention in the study of quantum mechanics because it is argued that, when challenged by the findings of quantum mechanics, classical physics must give up its claim to one of three assumptions: locality (no "spooky action at a distance"), no-conspiracy (called also "asymmetry of time"), or counterfactual definiteness (or "non-contextuality").

If physics gives up the claim to locality, it brings into question our ordinary ideas about causality and suggests that events may transpire at faster-than-light speeds.

If physics gives up the "no conspiracy" condition, it becomes possible for "nature to force experimenters to measure what she wants, and when she wants, hiding whatever she does not like physicists to see."

If physics rejects the possibility that, in all cases, there can be "counterfactual definiteness," then it rejects some features that humans are very much accustomed to regarding as enduring features of the universe. "The elements of reality the EPR paper is talking about are nothing but what the property interpretation calls properties existing independently of the measurements. In each run of the experiment, there exist some elements of reality, the system has particular properties < #a_{i} > which unambiguously determine the measurement outcome < a_{i} >, given that the corresponding measurement a is performed."

As a noun, "counterfactual" may refer to an inferred effect or consequence of an unobserved macroscopic event. An example is counterfactual quantum computation.

== Theoretical considerations ==
An interpretation of quantum mechanics can be said to involve the use of counterfactual definiteness if it includes in the mathematical modelling outcomes of measurements that are counterfactual; in particular, those that are excluded according to quantum mechanics by the fact that quantum mechanics does not contain a description of simultaneous measurement of conjugate pairs of properties.

For example, the uncertainty principle states that one cannot simultaneously know, with arbitrarily high precision, both the position and momentum of a particle. Suppose one measures the position of a particle. This act destroys any information about its momentum. Is it then possible to talk about the outcome that one would have obtained if one had measured its momentum instead of its position? In terms of mathematical formalism, is such a counterfactual momentum measurement to be included, together with the factual position measurement, in the statistical population of possible outcomes describing the particle? If the position were found to be r_{0} then in an interpretation that permits counterfactual definiteness, the statistical population describing position and momentum would contain all pairs (r_{0},p) for every possible momentum value p, whereas an interpretation that rejects counterfactual values completely would only have the pair (r_{0},⊥) where ⊥ (called "up tack" or "eet") denotes an undefined value. To use a macroscopic analogy, an interpretation which rejects counterfactual definiteness views measuring the position as akin to asking where in a room a person is located, while measuring the momentum is akin to asking whether the person's lap is empty or has something on it. If the person's position has changed by making him or her stand rather than sit, then that person has no lap and neither the statement "the person's lap is empty" nor "there is something on the person's lap" is true. Any statistical calculation based on values where the person is standing at some place in the room and simultaneously has a lap as if sitting would be meaningless.

The dependability of counterfactually definite values is a basic assumption, which, together with "time asymmetry" and "local causality" led to the Bell inequalities. Bell showed that the results of experiments intended to test the idea of hidden variables would be predicted to fall within certain limits based on all three of these assumptions, which are considered principles fundamental to classical physics, but that the results found within those limits would be inconsistent with the predictions of quantum mechanical theory. Experiments have shown that quantum mechanical results predictably exceed those classical limits. Calculating expectations based on Bell's work implies that for quantum physics the assumption of "local realism" must be abandoned. Bell's theorem proves that every type of quantum theory must necessarily violate locality or reject the possibility of extending the mathematical description with outcomes of measurements which were not actually made.

Counterfactual definiteness is present in any interpretation of quantum mechanics that allows quantum mechanical measurement outcomes to be seen as deterministic functions of a system's state or of the state of the combined system and measurement apparatus. Cramer's (1986) transactional interpretation does not make that interpretation.

== Examples of interpretations rejecting counterfactual definiteness ==
=== Copenhagen interpretation ===
The traditional Copenhagen interpretation of quantum mechanics rejects counterfactual definiteness as it does not ascribe any value at all to a measurement that was not performed. When measurements are performed, values result, but these are not considered to be revelations of pre-existing values. In the words of Asher Peres, "unperformed experiments have no results".

=== Many worlds ===
The many-worlds interpretation rejects counterfactual definiteness in a different sense; instead of not assigning a value to measurements that were not performed, it ascribes many values. When measurements are performed each of these values gets realized as the resulting value in a different world of a branching reality. As Prof. Guy Blaylock of the University of Massachusetts Amherst puts it, "The many-worlds interpretation is not only counterfactually indefinite, it is factually indefinite as well."

=== Consistent histories ===
The consistent histories approach rejects counterfactual definiteness in yet another manner; it ascribes single but hidden values to unperformed measurements and disallows combining values of incompatible measurements (counterfactual or factual) as such combinations do not produce results that would match any obtained purely from performed compatible measurements. When a measurement is performed the hidden value is nevertheless realized as the resulting value. Robert Griffiths likens these to "slips of paper" placed in "opaque envelopes". Thus Consistent Histories does not reject counterfactual results per se, it rejects them only when they are being combined with incompatible results. Whereas in the Copenhagen interpretation or the Many Worlds interpretation, the algebraic operations to derive Bell's inequality cannot proceed due to having no value or many values where a single value is required, in Consistent Histories, they can be performed but the resulting correlation coefficients can not be equated with those that would be obtained by actual measurements (which are instead given by the rules of quantum mechanical formalism). The derivation combines incompatible results, only some of which could be factual for a given experiment and the rest counterfactual.

== See also ==
- Determinism
- Elitzur–Vaidman bomb-tester
- Interaction-free measurement
- Naïve realism
- Quantum indeterminacy
- Renninger negative-result experiment
- Scientific realism
- Superdeterminism
- Wheeler's delayed choice experiment
- Counterfactual quantum computation
