= Renninger negative-result experiment =

Thought experiment in quantum mechanics

In quantum mechanics, the Renninger negative-result experiment is a thought experiment that illustrates some of the difficulties of understanding the nature of wave function collapse and measurement in quantum mechanics. The statement is that a particle need not be detected in order for a quantum measurement to occur, and that the lack of a particle detection can also constitute a measurement. The thought experiment was first posed in 1953 by Mauritius Renninger. The non-detection of a particle in one arm of an interferometer implies that the particle must be in the other arm. It can be understood to be a refinement of the paradox presented in the Mott problem.

== The Mott problem ==
The Mott problem concerns the paradox of reconciling the spherical wave function describing the emission of an alpha ray by a radioactive nucleus, with the linear tracks seen in a cloud chamber. Formulated in 1927 by Albert Einstein and Max Born, it was resolved by a calculation done by Sir Nevill Francis Mott that showed that the correct quantum mechanical system must include the wave functions for the atoms in the cloud chamber as well as that for the alpha ray. The calculation showed that the resulting probability is non-zero only on straight lines raying out from the decayed atom; that is, once the measurement is performed, the wave-function becomes non-vanishing only near the classical trajectory of a particle.

== Specification of the thought experiment ==
In Renninger's 1960 formulation, the cloud chamber is replaced by a pair of hemispherical particle detectors, completely surrounding a radioactive atom at the center that is about to decay by emitting an alpha ray. For the purposes of the thought experiment, the detectors are assumed to be 100% efficient, so that the emitted alpha ray is always detected.

By consideration of the normal process of quantum measurement, it is clear that if the detector on one hemisphere registers the decay, then the other will not: a single particle cannot be detected by both detectors. The core observation is that the non-observation of a particle on one of the shells is just as good a measurement as detecting it on the other.

The strength of the paradox can be heightened by considering the two hemispheres to be of different diameters; with the outer shell a good distance farther away. In this case, after the non-observation of the alpha ray on the inner shell, one is led to conclude that the (originally spherical) wave function has "collapsed" to a hemisphere shape, and (because the outer shell is distant) is still in the process of propagating to the outer shell, where it is guaranteed to eventually be detected.

== Common objections ==
There are a number of common objections to the standard interpretation of the experiment. Some of these objections, and standard rebuttals, are listed below.

=== Finite radioactive lifetime ===
It is sometimes noted that the time of the decay of the nucleus cannot be controlled, and that the finite half-life invalidates the result. This objection can be dispelled by sizing the hemispheres appropriately with regards to the half-life of the nucleus. The radii are chosen so that the more distant hemisphere is much farther away than the half-life of the decaying nucleus, times the flight-time of the alpha ray.

To lend concreteness to the example, assume that the half-life of the decaying nucleus is 0.01 microsecond (most elementary particle decay half-lives are much shorter; most nuclear decay half-lives are much longer; some atomic electromagnetic excitations have a half-life about this long). If one were to wait 0.4 microseconds, then the probability that the particle will have decayed will be $1-2^{-40}\simeq1-10^{-12}$; that is, the probability will be very very close to one. The outer hemisphere is then placed at (speed of light) times (0.4 microseconds) away: that is, at about 120 meters away. The inner hemisphere is taken to be much closer, say at 1 meter.

If, after (for example) 0.3 microseconds, one has not seen the decay product on the inner, closer, hemisphere, one can conclude that the particle has decayed with almost absolute certainty, but is still in-flight to the outer hemisphere. The paradox then concerns the correct description of the wave function in such a scenario.

=== Classical trajectories ===
Another common objection states that the decay particle was always travelling in a straight line, and that only the probability of the distribution is spherical. This, however, is a mis-interpretation of the Mott problem, and is false. The wave function was truly spherical, and is not the incoherent superposition (mixed state) of a large number of plane waves. The distinction between mixed and pure states is illustrated more clearly in a different context, in the debate comparing the ideas behind local-hidden variables and their refutation by means of the Bell inequalities.

=== Diffraction ===
A true quantum-mechanical wave would diffract from the inner hemisphere, leaving a diffraction pattern to be observed on the outer hemisphere. This is not really an objection, but rather an affirmation that a partial collapse of the wave function has occurred. If a diffraction pattern were not observed, one would be forced to conclude that the particle had collapsed down to a ray, and stayed that way, as it passed the inner hemisphere; this is clearly at odds with standard quantum mechanics. Diffraction from the inner hemisphere is expected.

=== Complex decay products ===
In this objection, it is noted that in real life, a decay product is either spin-1/2 (a fermion) or a photon (spin-1). This is taken to mean that the decay is not truly sphere symmetric, but rather has some other distribution, such as a p-wave. However, on closer examination, one sees this has no bearing on the spherical symmetry of the wave-function. Even if the initial state could be polarized; for example, by placing it in a magnetic field, the non-spherical decay pattern is still properly described by quantum mechanics.

=== Non-relativistic language ===
The above formulation is inherently phrased in a non-relativistic language; and it is noted that elementary particles have relativistic decay products. This objection only serves to confuse the issue. The experiment can be reformulated so that the decay product is slow-moving. At any rate, special relativity is not in conflict with quantum mechanics.

=== Imperfect detectors ===
This objection states that in real life, particle detectors are imperfect, and sometimes neither the detectors on the one hemisphere, nor the other, will go off. This argument only serves to confuse the issue, and has no bearing on the fundamental nature of the wave-function.

== See also ==
- Interaction-free measurement
- Elitzur–Vaidman bomb-tester
- Counterfactual definiteness
