= Richard Jozsa =

Australian mathematician (born 1953)

Richard Jozsa FRS
- Born: 13 November 1953 (age 72); Melbourne, Australia
- Education: Monash University; University of Oxford (DPhil)
- Known for: Deutsch–Jozsa algorithm; Schrödinger–HJW theorem; Counterfactual quantum computation; Fidelity of quantum states; No-broadcasting theorem; Quantum teleportation; Swap test
- Awards: Fellow of the Royal Society (2019); Naylor Prize and Lectureship (2004); QCMC International Quantum Communication Award (2004)
- Scientific career
- Fields: Mathematical physics; computer science
- Workplaces: University of Cambridge; University of Bristol; University of Plymouth; Université de Montréal
- Thesis: Models in categories and twistor theory (1981)
- Doctoral advisor: Roger Penrose
- Doctoral students: Simone Severini
- Website: www.damtp.cam.ac.uk/people/r.jozsa

Richard Jozsa FRS (born 13 November 1953) is an Australian mathematician who holds the Leigh Trapnell Chair in Quantum Physics at the University of Cambridge. He is a fellow of King's College, Cambridge, where his research investigates quantum information science.

A pioneer of his field, he is the co-author of the Deutsch–Jozsa algorithm and one of the co-inventors of quantum teleportation.

== Education ==
Jozsa received his Doctor of Philosophy degree on twistor theory at Oxford, under the supervision of Roger Penrose.

== Career and research ==
Jozsa has held previous positions at the University of Bristol, the University of Plymouth and the Université de Montréal.

=== Awards and honours ===
His work was recognised in 2004 by the London Mathematical Society with the award of the Naylor Prize for 'his fundamental contributions to the new field of quantum information science'. Since 2016, Jozsa is a member of the Academia Europaea.
