= Mauritius Renninger =

German theoretical physicist

Mauritius Renninger (8 June 1905 – 22 December 1987) was a German theoretical physicist noted for his work on crystallography and x-ray optics. He's known for the Renninger effect and for the Renninger negative-result experiment.

== See also ==
- Renninger negative-result experiment
- Mott problem
