= Quantum state space =

Mathematical space representing physical quantum systems

In physics, a quantum state space is an abstract space in which different "positions" represent not literal locations, but rather quantum states of some physical system. It is the quantum analog of the phase space of classical mechanics.

== Relative to Hilbert space ==
In quantum mechanics a state space is a separable complex Hilbert space. The dimension of this Hilbert space depends on the system we choose to describe. The different states that could come out of any particular measurement form an orthonormal basis, so any state vector in the state space can be written as a linear combination of these basis vectors. Having a nonzero component along multiple dimensions is called a superposition. In the formalism of quantum mechanics these state vectors are often written using Dirac's compact bra–ket notation.

== Examples ==
The spin state of a silver atom in the Stern–Gerlach experiment can be represented in a two state space. The spin can be aligned with a measuring apparatus (arbitrarily called 'up') or oppositely ('down'). In Dirac's notation these two states can be written as $|u\rangle, |d\rangle$. The space of a two spin system has four states, $|uu\rangle, |ud\rangle, |du\rangle, |dd\rangle$.

The spin state is a discrete degree of freedom; quantum state spaces can have continuous degrees of freedom. For example, a particle in one space dimension has one degree of freedom ranging from $-\infty$ to $\infty$. In Dirac notation, the states in this space might be written as $|q\rangle$ or $|\psi\rangle$.

== Relative to 3D space ==
Even in the early days of quantum mechanics, the state space (or configurations as they were called at first) was understood to be essential for understanding simple quantum-mechanical problems. In 1929, Nevill Mott showed that "tendency to picture the wave as existing in ordinary three dimensional space, whereas we are really dealing with wave functions in multispace" makes analysis of simple interaction problems more difficult. Mott analyzes $\alpha$-particle emission in a cloud chamber. The emission process is isotropic, a spherical wave in quantum mechanics, but the tracks observed are linear.

Spherical wave

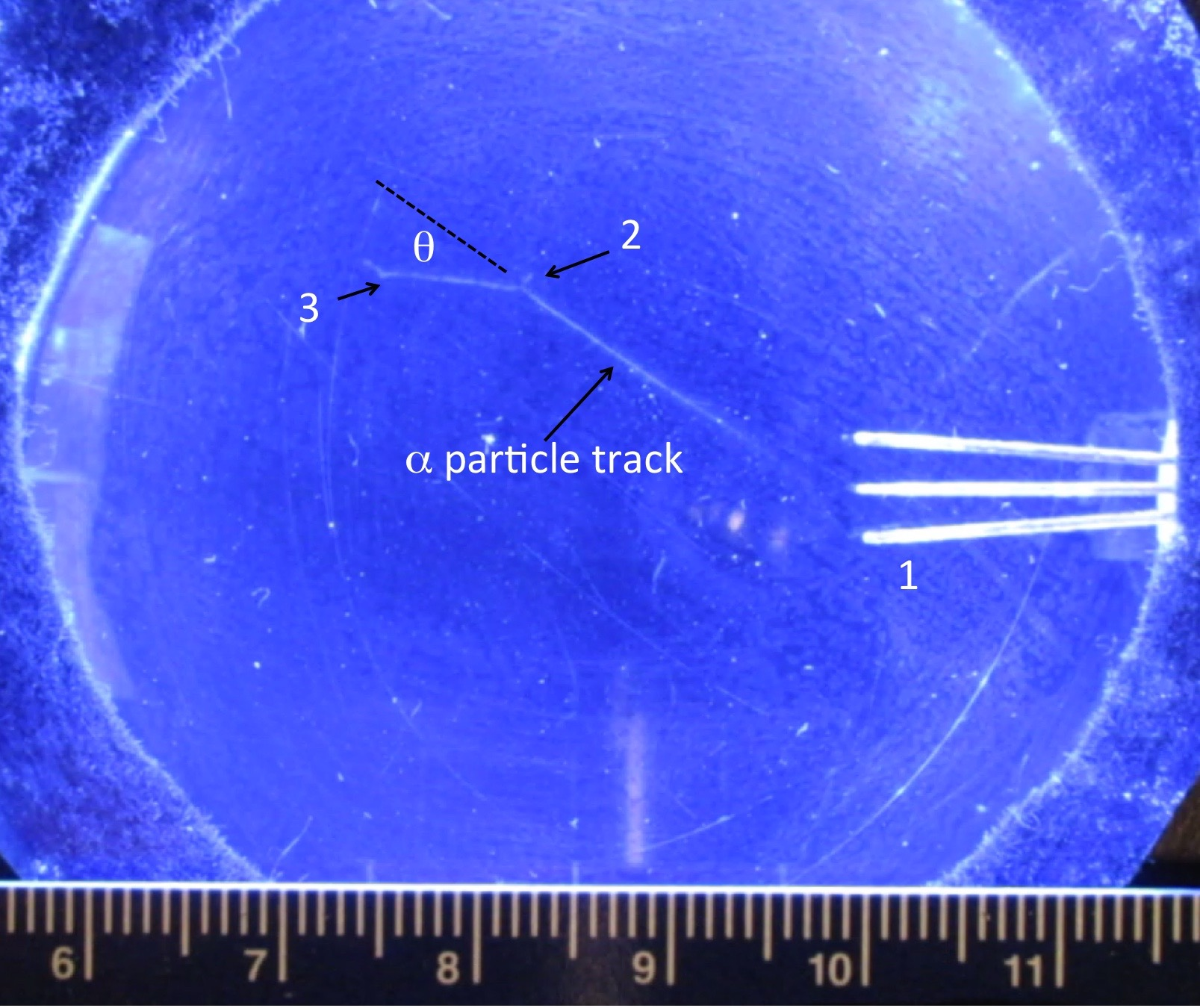
Alpha particle track in a cloud chamber

As Mott says, "it is a little difficult to picture how it is that an outgoing spherical wave can produce a straight track; we think intuitively that it should ionise atoms at random throughout space". This issue became known at the Mott problem. Mott then derives the straight track by considering correlations between the positions of the source and two representative atoms, showing that consecutive ionization results from just that state in which all three positions are co-linear.

== Relative to classical phase space ==
Classical mechanics for multiple objects describes their motion in terms of a list or vector of every object's coordinates and velocity. As the objects move, the values in the vector change; the set of all possible values is called a phase space. In quantum mechanics a state space is similar, however in the state space two vectors which are scalar multiples of each other represent the same state. Furthermore, the character of values in the quantum state differ from the classical values: in the quantum case the values can only be measured statistically (by repetition over many examples) and thus do not have well defined values at every instant of time.

== See also ==
- Quantum mechanics – Description of physical properties at the atomic and subatomic scale
- Quantum state – Mathematical entity to describe the probability of each possible measurement on a system
- Configuration space (physics) – Space of possible positions for all objects in a physical system
