= Adrian Kent =

British theoretical physicist

Adrian Kent is a British theoretical physicist. He is a professor at the University of Cambridge, member of the Centre for Quantum Information and Foundations, and Distinguished Visiting Research Chair at the Perimeter Institute for Theoretical Physics. His research focuses on quantum foundations, quantum information science, and quantum cryptography. In 1999 he published the first information-theoretically secure protocols for bit commitment and coin flipping, which were also the first relativistic cryptographic protocols. He is a co-inventor of quantum tagging, or quantum position authentication, providing the first schemes for position-based quantum cryptography. In 2005 he published with Lucien Hardy and Jonathan Barrett the first security proof of quantum key distribution based on the no-signalling principle.

== Work ==
=== Field theory ===
Kent's early contributions to physics were on topics related to conformal field theory. Together with Peter Goddard and David Olive, he introduced the coset construction classifying unitary highest weight representations of the Virasoro algebra, and described the Virasoro algebra's singular vectors. In addition, he investigated the representation theory of $N=2$ superconformal algebras.

=== Quantum cryptography ===
Kent is inventor of the field of relativistic quantum cryptography, where security of the cryptographic tasks is guaranteed from the properties of quantum information and from the relativistic physical principle stating that information cannot travel faster than the speed of light (no-signalling). In 1999 he published the first unconditionally secure protocols for bit commitment and strong coin tossing, relativistic protocols that evade no-go theorem by Mayers, Lo and Chau, and by Lo and Chau, respectively. He is a co-inventor of quantum tagging, or quantum position authentication, where the properties of quantum information and the no-signalling principle are used to authenticate the location of an object.

He published with Lucien Hardy and Jonathan Barrett the first security proof for quantum key distribution based on the no-signalling principle, where two parties can generate a secure secret key even if their devices are not trusted and they are not described by quantum theory, as long as they satisfy the no-signalling principle. With Roger Colbeck, he invented quantum randomness expansion, a task where an initial private random string is expanded into a larger private random string.

=== Quantum foundations ===
Kent is a critic of the many-worlds interpretation of quantum mechanics, as well as the consistent histories interpretation. He has outlined a solution to the quantum reality problem, also called the quantum measurement problem, that is consistent with relativistic quantum theory, proposing that physical reality is described by a randomly chosen configuration of physical quantities (or beables) like the stress–energy tensor, whose sample space is mathematically well defined and respects Lorentzian symmetry. He has proposed Causal Quantum Theory as an extension of quantum theory, according to which local causality holds and the reduction of the quantum state is a well-defined physical process, claiming that current Bell-type experiments have not completely ruled out this theory. He discovered the no-summoning theorem, which extends the no-cloning theorem of quantum information to Minkowski spacetime.

=== Other work ===
Kent is a member of the advisory panel for the Cambridge Centre for the Study of Existential Risk. He has discussed the mathematics of risk assessments for global catastrophes. He has proposed a solution to Fermi's paradox, hypothesizing that various intelligent extraterrestrial civilizations have existed, interacted and competed for resources, and have evolved to avoid advertising their existence.
