= Samuel L. Braunstein =

Australian quantum physicist (born 1961)

- Born: 1961 (age 64–65); Melbourne, Australia
- Education: University of Melbourne; California Institute of Technology
- Known for: Quantum teleportation; Continuous-variable quantum information; Quantum no-deleting theorem; no-hiding theorem
- Awards: Royal Society Wolfson Research Merit Award(2003)
- Scientific career
- Fields: Physicist
- Workplaces: University of Arizona; Technion; Weizmann Institute of Science; University of Ulm; University of Wales, Bangor; University of York
- Doctoral advisor: Carlton Morris Caves
- Doctoral students: Pieter Kok

Samuel Leon Braunstein (born 1961) is a professor at the University of York, England. He is a member of a research group in non-standard computation and has a particular interest in quantum information, quantum computation, and black hole thermodynamics.

Braunstein has written or edited three books and has published more than 140 papers, which have been cited over 40,000 times. His most important work is on quantum teleportation, and published in a paper titled Unconditional Quantum Teleportation. The paper has been cited more than 3,000 times and received significant coverage in both the scientific and mainstream press.

In February 2006, Braunstein made the news due to his involvement in the first successful demonstration of quantum telecloning.

From 2009, he began to research black hole thermodynamics, contributing to the black hole information paradox and the firewall paradox.

Braunstein co-authored papers with Gilles Brassard and Simone Severini, with whom he introduced the Braunstein-Ghosh-Severini Entropy of a graph.

== Education ==
Braunstein completed his PhD in 1988 at Caltech, under Carlton M. Caves. His dissertation was titled Novel Quantum States and Measurements.

== Academic career ==
- University of Melbourne - BSc and MSc in Physics
- California Institute of Technology - PhD in Physics, awarded in 1988
- University of Arizona, USA - Research Associate (1988 - 1991)
- Technion, Israel - Lady Davis Fellow (1991 - 1993)
- Weizmann Institute of Science, Israel - Feinberg Fellow (1993 - 1995)
- University of Ulm, Germany - Humboldt Fellow (1995 - 1996)
- School of Informatics, University of Wales, Bangor, Wales - Lecturer through Professor (1996 - 2003)
- Department of Computer Science, University of York, England - Professor (2003-)

== Awards and honors ==
- 2001 — Fellow of the Institute of Physics
- 2003 — Royal Society Wolfson Research Merit Award
- 2008 — Fellow of The Optical Society
- 2011 — Fellow of the American Association for the Advancement of Science

== Books ==
- Samuel L. Braunstein: Quantum Computing: Where Do We Want To Go Tomorrow?, Wiley-VCH, ISBN 3-527-40284-5
- Samuel L. Braunstein and Hoi-Kwong Lo: Scalable Quantum Computers: Paving the Way to Realization, Wiley-VCH, ISBN 3-527-40321-3
- Samuel L. Braunstein and Arun K. Pati (Eds.): Quantum Information with Continuous Variables, Springer, ISBN 1-4020-1195-4

== See also ==
- Quantum Aspects of Life
- Arun K. Pati
- Continuous-variable quantum information
