= No-teleportation theorem =

Theorem stating the impossibility of converting qubits into bits

In quantum information theory, the no-teleportation theorem states that an arbitrary quantum state cannot be converted into a sequence of classical bits (or even an infinite number of such bits); nor can such bits be used to reconstruct the original state, thus "teleporting" it by merely moving classical bits around. Put another way, it states that the unit of quantum information, the qubit, cannot be exactly, precisely converted into classical information bits. This should not be confused with quantum teleportation, which does allow a quantum state to be destroyed in one location, and an exact replica to be created at a different location.

In crude terms, the no-teleportation theorem stems from the Heisenberg uncertainty principle and the EPR paradox: although a qubit $|\psi\rangle$ can be imagined to be a specific direction on the Bloch sphere, that direction cannot be measured precisely, for the general case $|\psi\rangle$; if it could, the results of that measurement would be describable with words, i.e. classical information.

The no-teleportation theorem is implied by the no-cloning theorem: if it were possible to convert a qubit into classical bits, then a qubit would be easy to copy (since classical bits are trivially copyable).

== Formulation ==
The term quantum information refers to information stored in the state of a quantum system. Two quantum states ρ_{1} and ρ_{2} are identical if the measurement results of any physical observable have the same expectation value for ρ_{1} and ρ_{2}. Thus measurement can be viewed as an information channel with quantum input and classical output, that is, performing measurement on a quantum system transforms quantum information into classical information. On the other hand, preparing a quantum state takes classical information to quantum information.

In general, a quantum state is described by a density matrix. Suppose one has a quantum system in some mixed state ρ. Prepare an ensemble, of the same system, as follows:

1. Perform a measurement on ρ.
2. According to the measurement outcome, prepare a system in some pre-specified state.

The no-teleportation theorem states that the result will be different from ρ, irrespective of how the preparation procedure is related to measurement outcome. A quantum state cannot be determined via a single measurement. In other words, if a quantum channel measurement is followed by preparation, it cannot be the identity channel. Once converted to classical information, quantum information cannot be recovered.

In contrast, perfect transmission is possible if one wishes to convert classical information to quantum information then back to classical information. For classical bits, this can be done by encoding them in orthogonal quantum states, which can always be distinguished.

== See also ==
Among other no-go theorems in quantum information are:

- No-communication theorem. Entangled states cannot be used to transmit classical information.
- No-cloning theorem. Quantum states cannot be copied.
- No-broadcast theorem. A generalization of the no cloning theorem, to the case of mixed states.
- No-deleting theorem. A result dual to the no-cloning theorem: copies cannot be deleted.

With the aid of shared entanglement, quantum states can be teleported, see

- Quantum teleportation
