= No-go theorem =

Theorem of physical impossibility

In theoretical physics, a no-go theorem is a theorem that states that a particular situation is not physically possible. This type of theorem imposes boundaries on certain mathematical or physical possibilities via a proof by contradiction.

== Instances of no-go theorems ==
Full descriptions of the no-go theorems named below are given in other articles linked to their names. A few of them are broad, general categories under which several theorems fall. Other names are broad and general-sounding but only refer to a single theorem.

=== Classical electrodynamics ===
- Antidynamo theorems are a general category of theorems that restrict the type of magnetic fields that can be produced by dynamo action.
- Earnshaw's theorem states that a collection of point charges cannot be maintained in a stable stationary equilibrium configuration solely by the electrostatic interaction of the charges.

=== Non-relativistic quantum mechanics and quantum information ===
- Bell's theorem
- Kochen–Specker theorem
- No-broadcast theorem
- No-cloning theorem
- No-communication theorem in quantum information theory gives conditions under which instantaneous transfer of information between two observers is impossible.
- No-deleting theorem
- No-hiding theorem
- No-programming theorem - it is not possible to build a fixed, general purpose quantum computer which can be programmed to perform an arbitrary quantum computation.
- No-teleportation theorem
- PBR theorem
- Von Neumann's no hidden variables proof

=== Quantum field theory and string theory ===
- Coleman–Mandula theorem states that "space-time and internal symmetries cannot be combined in any but a trivial way".
- Goddard–Thorn theorem (no-ghost theorem)
- Haag–Łopuszański–Sohnius theorem is a generalisation of the Coleman–Mandula theorem.
- Haag's theorem states that the interaction picture does not exist in an interacting, relativistic, quantum field theory (QFT).
- Hegerfeldt's theorem implies that localizable free particles are incompatible with causality in relativistic quantum theory.
- Maldacena–Núñez no-go theorem: any compactification of type IIB string theory on an internal compact space with no brane sources will necessarily have a trivial warp factor and trivial fluxes.
- Nielsen–Ninomiya theorem limits when it is possible to formulate a chiral lattice theory for fermions.
- Reeh–Schlieder theorem
- Weinberg–Witten theorem states that massless particles (either composite or elementary) with spin $\; J > \tfrac{1}{2} \;$ cannot carry a Lorentz-covariant current, while massless particles with spin $\; J > 1 \;$ cannot carry a Lorentz-covariant stress-energy. It is usually interpreted to mean that the graviton ($\; J = 2 \;$) in a relativistic quantum field theory cannot be a composite particle.

=== Relativity and cosmology ===
- No-hair theorem, black holes are characterized only by mass, charge, and spin
- No-interaction theorem states that interactions cannot exist in finite system of particles in special relativity, unless fields are introduced
- Weinberg's no-go theorem (see cosmological constant problem).

== Proof of impossibility ==
In mathematics there is the concept of proof of impossibility referring to problems impossible to solve. The difference between this impossibility and that of the no-go theorems is that a proof of impossibility states a category of logical proposition that may never be true; a no-go theorem instead presents a sequence of events that may never occur.

== See also ==
- Arrow's impossibility theorem
