= Arun K. Pati =

Indian physicist

Arun Kumar Pati
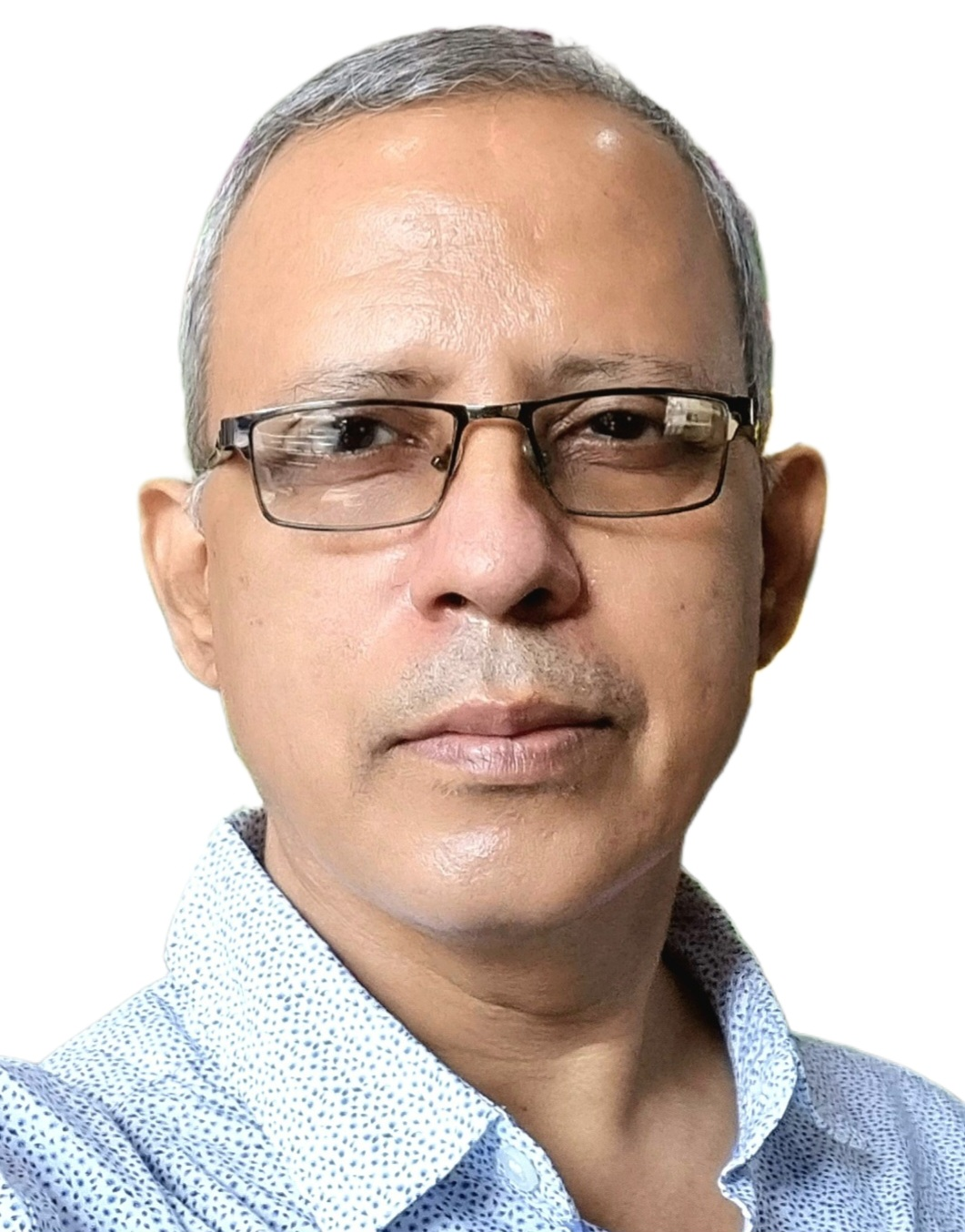
- Born: 13 April 1966 (age 60); Kokalunda, Ganjam, Odisha
- Education: Berhampur University, Odisha; University of Bombay
- Known for: Quantum no-deleting theorem Quantum no-hiding theorem Remote State Preparation; Stronger Uncertainty Relations
- Scientific career
- Fields: Quantum Physics; Quantum Information; Quantum Computation
- Workplaces: BARC, Mumbai, Institute of Physics, Bhubaneswar; Harish Chandra Research Institute, Allahabad

Arun Kumar Pati is an Indian physicist notable for his research in quantum information, quantum computation and Foundations of quantum mechanics. He has made pioneering contributions in the area of quantum information.

== Education ==
Arun K Pati completed his schooling from the Hari-Hara High School Aska, Ganjam, Odisha in 1981. He studied his bachelor's degree from Aska Science College, Aska during 1981–1985. He completed his master's degree in physics from Berhampur University, Odisha, in 1987. Subsequently, in 1988, he joined the Training School Program at BARC, Mumbai, India.

== Career ==
Originally from the state of Odisha in India, Pati obtained his PhD from the University of Bombay, Mumbai. In 1989, he took up a position as a theoretical physicist in the Theoretical Physics Division, BARC, Mumbai, India. Since 1989, he has been working on quantum theory, quantum computing and quantum information.

From 1998 to 2000, he was a visiting scientist and an EPSRC fellow at the University of Wales, Bangor, UK. He was a visiting scientist at the Institute of Physics, Bhubaneswar, India from 2001 to 2010. He was a professor of quantum information at the Harish Chandra Research Institute, Allahabad, India from January 2011 to December 2023. He was a Professor and Head of the Center for Quantum Science and Technology (CQST), at IIIT, Hyderabad. He was also a Professor at Center for Quantum Engineering Research and Education (CQuERE), TCG CREST, Kolkata. He is founding Director of Quantum Ecosystem and Technology Council of India (QETCI), Hyderabad.

He is honored with K. P. Chair Professorship at Zhejiang University, Hangzhou, China during the period 2013–2015.

== Work ==
Along with Samuel L. Braunstein, he proved the quantum no-deleting theorem. Similar to the no-cloning theorem, the no-deleting theorem is a fundamental consequence of the linearity of quantum mechanics. This proves that given two copies of an unknown quantum state we cannot delete one copy. The no-cloning and the no-deleting theorems suggest that we can neither create nor destroy quantum information. His other important collaborative work with Braunstein includes the quantum no-hiding theorem. This states that if quantum information is lost from one subsystem then it remains in the rest of the universe and cannot be hidden in the quantum correlation between the original system and the environment. This has applications that include quantum teleportation, quantum state randomization, thermalization and the black hole information loss paradox. The no-hiding theorem has been experimentally tested and this is a clear demonstration of the conservation of quantum information.

Pati also discovered the remote state preparation (RSP) protocol in quantum information theory. This is an important quantum communication scheme similar to quantum teleportation. In RSP protocol, Alice can prepare a known qubit chosen from special ensemble at Bob's location using a maximally entangled state and one bit of classical communication. This has been experimentally tested by several groups.

Pati along with Artur Ekert, Vlatko Vedral and other scientists have introduced the concept of geometric phase for mixed states. This has been experimentally measured by several groups around the world. In another fundamental work, Pati along with L. Maccone have discovered stronger uncertainty relations that go beyond the Heisenberg uncertainty relation. These new relations capture the notion of incompatible observables and show that quantum world is more uncertain than what Heisenberg-Robertson's uncertainty relation has explicated us.

== Honors ==
Pati is the recipient of the India Physics Association Award for Young Physicist of the Year (2000) and the Indian Physical Society Awards for Young Scientists (1996). He is also recipient of Samanta Chandra Sekhar Award for the year 2009 from Orissa Bigyan Academy, Bhubaneswar, Odisha. He is an elected Fellow of the Indian Academy of Science, Bangalore. He also has been elected as the Fellow of The National Academy of Sciences, India in 2013. He received J C Bose Fellowship from the Department of Science and Technology (DST), Government of India in 2019. He received Distinguished Alumni Award from Berhampur University, Odisha on its 55th Foundation Day in 2021.

His important research work have been featured in news items in Nature, Nature Asia and Science. Arun K Pati has been in the World Rank list of Top 2% Scientists recently published by the Stanford University. He is also among Top 1% Scientists in General Physics and holds First position among Indian Scientists in General Physics.

== Books by Pati ==
- Samuel L. Braunstein and Arun K. Pati, Quantum Information with Continuous Variables, Kluwer Academic Publisher, The Netherland, 2003.
- Derek Abbott, Paul C. W. Davies, and Arun K. Pati (Eds.), with foreword by Roger Penrose, Quantum Aspects of Life, Imperial College Press, 2008, ISBN 978-1-84816-253-2.

== See also ==
- Samuel L. Braunstein
- Quantum Aspects of Life
