= Coset construction =

Construction for Virasoro algebras

In mathematics, the coset construction (or GKO construction) is a method of constructing unitary highest weight representations of the Virasoro algebra, introduced by Peter Goddard, Adrian Kent and David Olive (1986). The construction produces the complete discrete series of highest weight representations of the Virasoro algebra and demonstrates their unitarity, thus establishing the classification of unitary highest weight representations.
