= Heinrich Leutwyler =

Swiss physicist (born 1938)

- Born: October 12, 1938 (age 87); Bern
- Education: University of Bern
- Known for: No-interaction theorem
- Awards: Humboldt Award (2000); Pomeranchuk Prize (2011); Sakurai Prize (2023)
- Scientific career
- Fields: Theoretical physics
- Workplaces: University of Bern
- Doctoral advisor: John R. Klauder
- Website: www.leutwyler.itp.unibe.ch

Heinrich Leutwyler (born Oct 12, 1938) is a Swiss theoretical physicist, with interests in elementary particle physics, the theory of strong interactions, and quantum field theory.

== Early life and education ==
Leutwyler went to the Gymnasium in Bern and studied physics, mathematics, and astronomy at the University of Bern. After the diploma in 1960 he went to the US, including Princeton. In 1962 he received his PhD under the supervision of John R. Klauder (at Bell Laboratories at the time), for his thesis entitled "Generally covariant Dirac equation and associated Boson Fields."

== Career ==
In 1965 he got his habilitation in Bern, where he became assistant professor in the same year and full professor in 1969, until his retirement in 2000.

Leutwyler generalized no-interaction theorem for any number of particles in 1965.

In 1983/84 he was dean of the Faculty of Sciences. Leutwyler spent research visits at the Bell Labs in Murray Hill (1963, 1965), at Caltech in Pasadena (1973/74), and at CERN (1969/70, 1983/84, and 1996). Together with Murray Gell-Mann and Harald Fritzsch, Leutwyler was crucially involved in establishing quantum chromodynamics (QCD) as the fundamental theory of strong interactions. Together with Jürg Gasser he performed influential work on chiral perturbation theory, an effective field theory describing QCD at low energies, including the Gasser–Leutwyler coefficients of the effective Lagrangian and the determination of current quark masses.

== Honors and awards ==
Leutwyler received an honorary doctorate of the Johannes Gutenberg University Mainz (1995), the Humboldt Award (2000), the Pomeranchuk Prize (2011), the Sakurai Prize (2023), and the High Energy and Particle Physics Prize by the European Physical Society (2025).

== Publications ==
- Fritzsch, Gellmann, and Leutwyler: Advantages of the color octet gluon picture. In: Physics Letters B, volume 47, 1973, p. 365
- Gasser and Leutwyler: Quark masses. In: Physics Reports, volume 87, 1982, p. 77
- Gasser and Leutwyler: Chiral Perturbation Theory to One Loop. In: Annals of Physics, volume 158, 1984, p. 142
- Gasser and Leutwyler: Chiral Perturbation Theory: Expansions in the Mass of the Strange Quark. In: Nuclear Physics B, volume 250, 1985, p. 465
- Leutwyler, On the history of the strong interaction, Erice 2012
