= Quantum cloning =

Process of copying a quantum state with no modification of the original

Quantum cloning is a process that takes an arbitrary, unknown quantum state and makes an exact copy without altering the original state in any way. Quantum cloning is forbidden by the laws of quantum mechanics as shown by the no cloning theorem, which states that there is no operation for cloning any arbitrary state ${\displaystyle |\psi \rangle _{A}}$ perfectly. In Dirac notation, the process of quantum cloning is described by:

${\displaystyle U|\psi \rangle _{A}|e\rangle _{B}=|\psi \rangle _{A}|\psi \rangle _{B}},$

where ${\displaystyle U}$ is the actual cloning operation, ${\displaystyle |\psi \rangle _{A}}$ is the state to be cloned, and ${\displaystyle |e\rangle _{B}}$ is the initial state of the copy.

Though perfect quantum cloning is not possible, it is possible to perform imperfect cloning, where the copies have a non-unit (i.e. non-perfect) fidelity. The possibility of approximate quantum copying was first addressed by Buzek and Hillery, and theoretical bounds were derived on the fidelity of cloned quantum states.

One of the applications of quantum cloning is to analyse the security of quantum key distribution protocols. Teleportation, nuclear magnetic resonance, quantum amplification, and superior phase conjugation are examples of some methods utilized to realize a quantum cloning machine. Ion trapping techniques have been applied to cloning quantum states of ions.

== Types of quantum cloning machines ==
It may be possible to clone a quantum state to arbitrary accuracy in the presence of closed timelike curves.

=== Universal quantum cloning ===
Universal quantum cloning (UQC) implies that the quality of the output (cloned state) is not dependent on the input, thus the process is "universal" to any input state. The output state produced is governed by the Hamiltonian of the system.

One of the first cloning machines, a 1 to 2 UQC machine, was proposed in 1996 by Buzek and Hillery. As the name implies, the machine produces two identical copies of a single input qubit with a fidelity of 5/6 when comparing only one output qubit, and global fidelity of 2/3 when comparing both qubits. This idea was expanded to more general cases such as an arbitrary number of inputs and copies, as well as d-dimensional systems.

Multiple experiments have been conducted to realize this type of cloning machine physically by using photon stimulated emission. The concept relies on the property of certain three-level atoms to emit photons of any polarization with equally likely probability. This symmetry ensures the universality of the machine.

=== Phase covariant cloning ===
When input states are restricted to Bloch vectors corresponding to points on the equator of the Bloch Sphere, more information is known about them. The resulting clones are thus state-dependent, having an optimal fidelity of $1/2 + \sqrt{1/8} \approx 0.8536$. Although only having a fidelity slightly greater than the UQCM (≈0.83), phase covariant cloning has the added benefit of being easily implemented through quantum logic gates consisting of the rotational operator $\hat{R}(\vartheta)$and the controlled-NOT (CNOT). Output states are also separable according to Peres–Horodecki criterion.

The process has been generalized to the 1 → M case and proven optimal. This has also been extended to the qutrit and qudit cases. The first experimental asymmetric quantum cloning machine was realized in 2004 using nuclear magnetic resonance.

=== Asymmetric quantum cloning ===
The first family of asymmetric quantum cloning machines was proposed by Nicolas Cerf in 1998. A cloning operation is said to be asymmetric if its clones have different qualities and are all independent of the input state. This is a more general case of the symmetric cloning operations discussed above which produce identical clones with the same fidelity. Take the case of a simple 1 → 2 asymmetric cloning machine. There is a natural trade-off in the cloning process in that if one clone's fidelity is fixed to a higher value, the other must decrease in quality and vice versa. The optimal trade-off is bounded by the following inequality:

$(1-F_d)(1-F_e)\geq[1/2-(1-F_d)-(1-F_e)]^2$ where F_{d} and F_{e} are the state-independent fidelities of the two copies. This type of cloning procedure was proven mathematically to be optimal as derived from the Choi-Jamiolkowski channel state duality. However, even with this cloning machine perfect quantum cloning is proved to be unattainable.

The trade-off of optimal accuracy between the resulting copies has been studied in quantum circuits, and with regards to theoretical bounds.

Optimal asymmetric cloning machines are extended to $M \rightarrow N$ in $d$ dimensions.

=== Probabilistic quantum cloning ===
In 1998, Duan and Guo proposed a different approach to quantum cloning machines that relies on probability. This machine allows for the perfect copying of quantum states without violation of the No-Cloning and No-Broadcasting Theorems, but at the cost of not being 100% reproducible. The cloning machine is termed "probabilistic" because it performs measurements in addition to a unitary evolution. These measurements are then sorted through to obtain the perfect copies with a certain quantum efficiency (probability). As only orthogonal states can be cloned perfectly, this technique can be used to identify non-orthogonal states. The process is optimal when $\eta=1/(1+|\langle\Psi_0|\Psi_1\rangle)$ where η is the probability of success for the states Ψ_{0} and Ψ_{1}.

The process was proven mathematically to clone two pure, non-orthogonal input states using a unitary-reduction process. One implementation of this machine was realized through the use of a "noiseless optical amplifier" with a success rate of about 5% .

== Applications of approximate quantum cloning ==
=== Cloning in discrete quantum systems ===
The simple basis for approximate quantum cloning exists in the first and second trivial cloning strategies. In first trivial cloning, a measurement of a qubit in a certain basis is made at random and yields two copies of the qubit. This method has a universal fidelity of 2/3.

The second trivial cloning strategy, also called "trivial amplification", is a method in which an original qubit is left unaltered, and another qubit is prepared in a different orthogonal state. When measured, both qubits have the same probability, 1/2, (check) and an overall single copy fidelity of 3/4.

=== Quantum cloning attacks ===
Quantum information is useful in the field of cryptography due to its intrinsic encrypted nature. One such mechanism is quantum key distribution. In this process, Bob receives a quantum state sent by Alice, in which some type of classical information is stored. He then performs a random measurement, and using minimal information provided by Alice, can determine whether or not his measurement was "good". This measurement is then transformed into a key in which private data can be stored and sent without fear of the information being stolen.

One reason this method of cryptography is so secure is because it is impossible to eavesdrop due to the no-cloning theorem. A third party, Eve, can use incoherent attacks in an attempt to observe the information being transferred from Bob to Alice. Due to the no-cloning theorem, Eve is unable to gain any information. However, through quantum cloning, this is no longer entirely true.

Incoherent attacks involve a third party gaining some information into the information being transmitted between Bob and Alice. These attacks follow two guidelines: 1) third party Eve must act individually and match the states that are being observed, and 2) Eve's measurement of the traveling states occurs after the sifting phase (removing states that are in non-matched bases) but before reconciliation (putting Alice and Bob's strings back together). Due to the secure nature of quantum key distribution, Eve would be unable to decipher the secret key even with as much information as Bob and Alice. These are known as an incoherent attacks because a random, repeated attack yields the highest chance of Eve finding the key.

=== Nuclear magnetic resonance ===
While classical nuclear magnetic resonance is the phenomenon of nuclei emitting electromagnetic radiation at resonant frequencies when exposed to a strong magnetic field and is used heavily in imaging technology, quantum nuclear magnetic resonance is a type of quantum information processing (QIP). The interactions between the nuclei allow for the application of quantum logic gates, such as the CNOT.

One quantum NMR experiment involved passing three qubits through a circuit, after which they are all entangled; the second and third qubit are transformed into clones of the first with a fidelity of 5/6.

Another application allowed for the alteration of the signal-noise ratio, a process that increased the signal frequency while decreasing the noise frequency, allowing for a clearer information transfer. This is done through polarization transfer, which allows for a portion of the signal's highly polarized electric spin to be transferred to the target nuclear spin.

The NMR system allows for the application of quantum algorithms such as Shor factorization and the Deutsch-Joza algorithm.

=== Stimulated emission ===
Stimulated emission is a type of Universal Quantum Cloning Machine that functions on a three-level system: one ground and two degenerates that are connected by an orthogonal electromagnetic field. The system is able to emit photons by exciting electrons between the levels. The photons are emitted in varying polarizations due to the random nature of the system, but the probability of emission type is equal for all – this is what makes this a universal cloning machine. By integrating quantum logic gates into the stimulated emission system, the system is able to produce cloned states.

=== Telecloning ===
Telecloning is the combination of quantum teleportation and quantum cloning. This process uses positive operator-valued measurements, maximally entangled states, and quantum teleportation to create identical copies, locally and in a remote location. Quantum teleportation alone follows a "one-to-one" or "many-to-many" method in which either one or many states are transported from Alice, to Bob in a remote location. The teleclone works by first creating local quantum clones of a state, then sending these to a remote location by quantum teleportation.

The benefit of this technology is that it removes errors in transmission that usually result from quantum channel decoherence.

== See also ==
- No-cloning theorem
- No-broadcast theorem
- Quantum no-deleting theorem
