= No-deleting theorem =

Foundational theorem of quantum information processing

In physics, the no-deleting theorem of quantum information theory is a no-go theorem which states that, in general, given two copies of some arbitrary quantum state, it is impossible to delete one of the copies. It is a time-reversed dual to the no-cloning theorem, which states that arbitrary states cannot be copied. It was proved by Arun K. Pati and Samuel L. Braunstein. Deleting in this sense is not the same as irreversible erasure as described by Landauer's principle: an unknown state can be erased, for example by swapping it with a standard state and discarding it into the environment. Deleting is closer to a reversible "uncopying" of one of two identical copies, and the theorem shows that this cannot be done for an unknown quantum state, either reversibly or irreversibly. Intuitively, it is because information is conserved under unitary evolution.

This theorem seems remarkable, because, in many senses, quantum states are fragile; the theorem asserts that, in a particular case, they are also robust.

The no-deleting theorem, together with the no-cloning theorem, underpin the interpretation of quantum mechanics in terms of category theory, and, in particular, as a dagger symmetric monoidal category. This formulation, known as categorical quantum mechanics, in turn allows a connection to be made from quantum mechanics to linear logic as the logic of quantum information theory (in exact analogy to classical logic being founded on Cartesian closed categories).

== Overview ==
Suppose that there are two copies of an unknown quantum state. A pertinent question in this context is to ask if it is possible, given two identical copies, to delete one of them using quantum mechanical operations? It turns out that one cannot. The no-deleting theorem is a consequence of linearity of quantum mechanics. Like the no-cloning theorem this has important implications in quantum computing, quantum information theory and quantum mechanics in general.

The process of quantum deleting takes two copies of an arbitrary, unknown quantum state at the input port and outputs a blank state along with the original. Mathematically, this can be described by:

$$U |\psi\rangle_A |\psi\rangle_B |A\rangle_C = |\psi\rangle_A |0\rangle_B |A'\rangle_C$$

where $U$ is a unitary operator, $|\psi\rangle_A$ is the unknown quantum state, $|0\rangle_B$ is the blank state, $|A\rangle_C$ is the initial state of the deleting machine and $|A'\rangle_C$ is the final state of the machine.

It may be noted that classical bits can be copied and deleted, as can qubits in orthogonal states. For example, a controlled-NOT gate transforms the two-copy states $|00 \rangle$ and $|11 \rangle$ into $|00 \rangle$ and $|10 \rangle$, resetting the second copy to the standard state $|0 \rangle$. In this case we have deleted the second copy. However, it follows from linearity of quantum theory that there is no $U$ that can perform the deleting operation for any arbitrary state $|\psi\rangle$.

== Formal statement ==
Given three Hilbert spaces for systems $A, B, C$, such that the Hilbert spaces for systems $A, B$ are identical.

If $U$ is a unitary transformation, and $|A \rangle_C$ is an ancilla state, such that
$$U |\psi\rangle_A |\psi\rangle_B |A\rangle_C = |\psi\rangle_A |0\rangle_B |A_\psi\rangle_C, \quad \forall | \psi \rangle$$
where the final state of the ancilla $|A_\psi\rangle_C$ may depend on $|\psi\rangle$, then $U$ is a swapping operation, in the sense that the map $|\psi\rangle_A \mapsto |A_\psi\rangle_C$ is an isometric embedding.

=== Proof ===
The theorem holds for quantum states in a Hilbert space of any dimension. For simplicity, consider the deleting transformation for two identical qubits. If two qubits are in orthogonal states, then deletion requires that

$$|0 \rangle_A |0 \rangle_B |A\rangle_C \rightarrow |0\rangle_A |0\rangle_B |A_0\rangle_C$$,
$$|1 \rangle_A |1 \rangle_B |A\rangle_C \rightarrow |1 \rangle_A |0\rangle_B |A_1\rangle_C$$.

Let $|\psi\rangle = \alpha |0\rangle + \beta |1 \rangle$ be the state of an unknown qubit. If we have two copies of an unknown qubit, then by linearity of the deleting transformation we have

$$|\psi\rangle_A |\psi\rangle_B |A\rangle_C = [\alpha^2 |0 \rangle_A |0\rangle_B + \beta^2
|1\rangle_A |1\rangle_B + \alpha \beta (|0\rangle_A |1\rangle_B + |1 \rangle_A |0\rangle_B ) ]
|A \rangle_C$$
$$\qquad \rightarrow
\alpha^2 |0 \rangle_A |0\rangle_B |A_0\rangle_C + \beta^2
|1\rangle_A |0\rangle_B |A_1\rangle_C+ {\sqrt 2} \alpha \beta |\Phi \rangle_{ABC}.$$

In the above expression, the following transformation has been used:

$$1/{\sqrt 2}(|0\rangle_A |1\rangle_B + |1 \rangle_A |0\rangle_B ) |A \rangle_C \rightarrow |\Phi \rangle_{ABC} .$$

However, if we are able to delete a copy, then, at the output port of the deleting machine, the combined state should be

$$|\psi\rangle_A |0\rangle_B |A'\rangle_C =
(\alpha |0 \rangle_A |0\rangle_B  + \beta |1\rangle_A |0\rangle_B) |A'\rangle_C$$.

In general, these states are not identical and hence we can say that the machine fails to delete a copy. If we require that the final output states are same, then we will see that there is only one option:

$$|\Phi\rangle = 1/{\sqrt 2}(|0 \rangle_A |0\rangle_B |A_1\rangle_C +  |1\rangle_A |0\rangle_B |A_0\rangle_C),$$

and

$$|A'\rangle_C = \alpha |A_0\rangle_C +  \beta |A_1\rangle_C .$$

Since final state $|A' \rangle$ of the ancilla is normalized for all values of $\alpha, \beta$ it must be true that $|A_0\rangle_C$ and $|A_1\rangle_C$ are orthogonal. This means that the quantum information is simply in the final state of the ancilla. One can always obtain the unknown state from the final state of the ancilla using local operation on the ancilla Hilbert space. Thus, linearity of quantum theory does not allow an unknown quantum state to be deleted perfectly.

== Consequence ==
- If it were possible to delete an unknown quantum state, then, using two pairs of EPR states, we could send signals faster than light. Thus, violation of the no-deleting theorem is inconsistent with the no-signalling condition.
- The no-cloning and the no-deleting theorems point to the conservation of quantum information.
- Stronger versions of the no-cloning theorem and the no-deleting theorem provide permanence to quantum information. To create a copy one must import the information from some part of the universe and to delete a state one needs to export it to another part of the universe where it will continue to exist.

== See also ==
- No-broadcast theorem
- No-cloning theorem
- No-communication theorem
- No-hiding theorem
- Quantum cloning
- Quantum entanglement
- Quantum information
- Quantum teleportation
- Uncertainty principle
- Landauer's principle
