= Hegerfeldt's theorem =

Theorem in relativistic quantum mechanics

Hegerfeldt's theorem is a no-go theorem that demonstrates the incompatibility of the existence of spatially localized discrete particles with the combination of the principles of quantum mechanics and special relativity. A crucial requirement is that the states of single particle have positive energy. It has been used to support the conclusion that reality must be described solely in terms of field-based formulations. However, it is possible to construct localization observables in terms of positive-operator valued measures that are compatible with the restrictions imposed by the Hegerfeldt theorem.

Specifically, Hegerfeldt's theorem refers to a free particle whose time evolution is determined by a positive Hamiltonian. If the particle is initially confined in a bounded spatial region, then the spatial region where the probability to find the particle does not vanish, expands superluminarly, thus violating Einstein causality by exceeding the speed of light. Boundedness of the initial localization region can be weakened to a suitably exponential decay of the localization probability at the initial time. The localization threshold is provided by twice the Compton length of the particle. As a matter of fact, the theorem rules out the Newton-Wigner localization.

The theorem was developed by Gerhard C. Hegerfeldt and first published in 1974.

== See also ==
- Wave–particle duality
- Local realism
