= Coleman–Mandula theorem =

No-go theorem pertaining the triviality of space-time and internal symmetries

In theoretical physics, the Coleman–Mandula theorem is a no-go theorem stating that spacetime and internal symmetries can only combine in a trivial way. This means that the charges associated with internal symmetries must always transform as Lorentz scalars. Some notable exceptions to the no-go theorem are conformal symmetry and supersymmetry. It is named after Sidney Coleman and Jeffrey Mandula who proved it in 1967 as the culmination of a series of increasingly generalized no-go theorems investigating how internal symmetries can be combined with spacetime symmetries. The supersymmetric generalization is known as the Haag–Łopuszański–Sohnius theorem.

== History ==
In the early 1960s, the global $\text{SU}(3)$ flavor symmetry associated with the eightfold way was shown to successfully describe the hadron spectrum for hadrons of the same spin. This led to efforts to expand the global $\text{SU}(3)$ symmetry to a larger $\text{SU}(6)$ symmetry mixing both flavour and spin, an idea similar to that previously considered in nuclear physics by Eugene Wigner in 1937 for an $\text{SU}(4)$ symmetry. This non-relativistic $\text{SU}(6)$ model united vector and pseudoscalar mesons of different spin into a 35-dimensional multiplet and it also united the two baryon decuplets into a 56-dimensional multiplet. While this was reasonably successful in describing various aspects of the hadron spectrum, from the perspective of quantum chromodynamics this success is merely a consequence of the flavour and spin independence of the force between quarks. There were many attempts to generalize this non-relativistic $\text{SU}(6)$ model into a fully relativistic one, but these all failed.

At the time it was also an open question whether there existed a symmetry for which particles of different masses could belong to the same multiplet. Such a symmetry could then account for the mass splitting found in mesons and baryons. It was only later understood that this is instead a consequence of the differing up-, down-, and strange-quark masses which leads to a breakdown of the $\text{SU}(3)$ internal flavor symmetry.

These two motivations led to a series of no-go theorems to show that spacetime symmetries and internal symmetries could not be combined in any but a trivial way. The first notable theorem was proved by William McGlinn in 1964, with a subsequent generalization by Lochlainn O'Raifeartaigh in 1965. These efforts culminated with the most general theorem by Sidney Coleman and Jeffrey Mandula in 1967.

Little notice was given to this theorem in subsequent years. As a result, the theorem played no role in the early development of supersymmetry, which instead emerged in the early 1970s from the study of dual resonance models, which are the precursor to string theory, rather than from any attempts to overcome the no-go theorem. Similarly, the Haag–Łopuszański–Sohnius theorem, a supersymmetric generalization of the Coleman–Mandula theorem, was proved in 1975 after the study of supersymmetry was already underway.

== Theorem ==
Consider a theory that can be described by an S-matrix and that satisfies the following conditions

- The symmetry group is a Lie group which includes the Poincaré group as a subgroup,
- Below any mass, there are only a finite number of particle types,
- Any two-particle state undergoes some reaction at almost all energies,
- The amplitudes for elastic two-body scattering are analytic functions of the scattering angle at almost all energies and angles,
- A technical assumption that the group generators are distributions in momentum space.

The Coleman–Mandula theorem states that the symmetry group of this theory is necessarily a direct product of the Poincaré group and an internal symmetry group. The last technical assumption is unnecessary if the theory is described by a quantum field theory and is only needed to apply the theorem in a wider context.

A kinematic argument for why the theorem should hold was provided by Edward Witten. The argument is that Poincaré symmetry acts as a very strong constraint on elastic scattering, leaving only the scattering angle unknown. Any additional spacetime-dependent symmetry would overdetermine the amplitudes, making them nonzero only at discrete scattering angles. Since this conflicts with the assumption of the analyticity of the scattering angles, such additional spacetime-dependent symmetries are ruled out.

== Limitations ==
=== Conformal symmetry ===
The theorem does not apply to a theory of massless particles, with these allowing for conformal symmetry as an additional spacetime-dependent symmetry. In particular, the algebra of this group is the conformal algebra, which consists of the Poincaré algebra together with the commutation relations for the dilaton generator and the special conformal transformations generator.

=== Supersymmetry ===
The Coleman–Mandula theorem assumes that the only symmetry algebras are Lie algebras, but the theorem can be generalized by instead considering Lie superalgebras. Doing this allows for additional anticommutating generators known as supercharges which transform as spinors under Lorentz transformations. This extension gives rise to the super-Poincaré algebra, with the associated symmetry known as supersymmetry. The Haag–Łopuszański–Sohnius theorem is the generalization of the Coleman–Mandula theorem to Lie superalgebras, with it stating that supersymmetry is the only new spacetime-dependent symmetry that is allowed. For a theory with massless particles, the theorem is again evaded by conformal symmetry which can be present in addition to supersymmetry giving a superconformal algebra.

=== Low dimensions ===
In a one or two dimensional theory the only possible scattering is forwards and backwards scattering so analyticity of the scattering angles is no longer possible and the theorem no longer holds. Spacetime-dependent internal symmetries are then possible, such as in the massive Thirring model which can admit an infinite tower of conserved charges of ever higher tensorial rank.

=== Quantum groups ===
Models with nonlocal symmetries whose charges do not act on multiparticle states as if they were a tensor product of one-particle states, evade the theorem. Such an evasion is found more generally for quantum group symmetries which avoid the theorem because the corresponding algebra is no longer a Lie algebra.

=== Other limitations ===
For other spacetime symmetries besides the Poincaré group, such as theories with a de Sitter background or non-relativistic field theories with Galilean invariance, the theorem no longer applies. It also does not hold for discrete symmetries, since these are not Lie groups, or for spontaneously broken symmetries since these do not act on the S-matrix level and thus do not commute with the S-matrix.

== See also ==
- Extended supersymmetry
- Supergroup
- Supersymmetry algebra
