= No-interaction theorem =

Physical theorem in special relativity

In classical mechanics, the no-interaction theorem is a no-go theorem that shows that a system of many interacting particles cannot exist when special relativity is taken into account. It concludes that the only allowed configuration is that of a system of free particles only. The theorem is important for modern physics, as it suggest the necessity of introducing fields to describe interactions between particles. This theorem excludes the possibility of action at a distance. The modern understanding of the fundamental interactions (gravity, electromagnetism and nuclear forces) is that objects can interact by locally perturbing the fields in which each interaction propagates.

Various formulations of the theorem exist. The earliest version was given by Douglas G. Currie, Thomas F. Jordan and E. C. George Sudarshan in 1963, extended by John T. Cannon and Jordan in 1964, and generalized by Heinrich Leutwyler in 1965. An alternative formulation was given by Hendrik van Dam and Eugene Wigner in 1966.

== Assumptions ==
Consider a system with a finite number N of particles described by special relativity using Lagrangian or Hamiltonian mechanics. The no-interaction theorem states that, aside from contact forces, there can be no direct interaction between any two particles in a form that is manifestly invariant under Lorentz transformations (covariant). The theorem can be explicitly shown using three postulates:

1. Conservation of total linear momentum: the total four-momentum at a given time $t$ is expressed as $P^\mu(t)=\sum_{a=1}^N P_{(a)}^\mu(t)$, where $P_{(a)}^\mu(t)$ is the four-momentum of particle $a$. The postulate assumes that $P^\mu(t)=\text{constant}$ at any time.
2. No coincidence: there are no two distinct particles $a$ and $b$ with proper times $t_a,t_b$ such that $P_{(a)}^\mu(t_a)=P_{(b)}^\mu(t_b)$.
3. Asymptotically straight world lines: for large times, $t_a\to \pm \infty$, $P_{(a)}^\mu(t_a)\to \text{constant}$ .

which leads to the momentum of individual particles being constant (no interactions) at any time. The third postulate implies that the total momentum transforms under Lorentz transformations.

More advanced proofs rely on group theoretical arguments.

== Case of two identical particles ==
The no-interaction theorem indicates that two classical particles of mass $m$ cannot interact. If $u^\mu_{(1)}$ is the four-velocity of particle 1 and $u^\mu_{(2)}$ the four-velocity of particle 2, the total momentum is
$$P^\mu=mu_{(1)}^\mu+mu_{(2)}^\mu.$$
In another frame, the four-momentum transforms as
$$P'^\mu=a^{\mu}{}_\nu P^\nu$$
for some Lorentz boost $a^\mu{}_\nu$.

Van Dam and Wigner prove by contradiction that momentum is not conserved unless the particles come into contact. Supposing particle 1 is at point P at time $t=0$ and also at point P at time $t'=0$ (following its world line), and particle 2 is at point Q at $t=0$ and at Q' at $t'=0$, the transformation of the total momentum is given by
$$mu_{(1)}^{\prime\mu}|_P+mu_{(2)}^{\prime\mu}|_Q=a^{\mu}{}_\nu \left(mu_{(1)}^\nu|_P+mu_{(2)}^\nu |_{Q'}\right),$$
but as the four-velocity at point P also transforms as
$$u_{(1)}^{\prime\mu}|_P=a^{\mu}{}_\nu u_{(1)}^\nu|_P,$$
and at point Q as
$$u_{(2)}^{\prime\mu}|_Q=a^{\mu}{}_\nu u_{(2)}^\nu|_Q,$$
as $a^\mu{}_\nu$ is arbitrary we conclude that
$$u_{(2)}^{\mu}|_{Q'}= u_{(2)}^\mu|_Q,$$
meaning that the velocity of particle 2 remains constant when moving from Q to Q'. This result implies that the momentum of each particle remains constant, which would be the case if the particles did not interact.
