= No-communication theorem =

Principle in quantum information theory

In physics, the no-communication theorem (also referred to as the no-signaling principle) is a no-go theorem in quantum information theory. It asserts that during the measurement of an entangled quantum state, it is impossible for one observer to transmit information to another observer, regardless of their spatial separation. This conclusion preserves the principle of causality in quantum mechanics and ensures that information transfer does not violate special relativity by exceeding the speed of light.

The theorem is significant because quantum entanglement creates correlations between distant events that might initially appear to enable faster-than-light communication. The no-communication theorem demonstrates that the failure of local causality does not imply that "spooky action at a distance," a phrase often attributed to Einstein, can be used to communicate faster than light.

== Informal overview ==
The no-communication theorem states that, within the context of quantum mechanics, it is not possible to transmit classical bits of information by means of carefully prepared mixed or pure states, whether entangled or not. The theorem is only a sufficient condition that states that if the Kraus matrices commute then there can be no communication through the quantum entangled states and that this is applicable to all communication. From a relativity and quantum field perspective, also faster than light or "instantaneous" communication is disallowed. Being only a sufficient condition, there can be other reasons communication is not allowed.

The basic premise entering into the theorem is that a quantum-mechanical system is prepared in an initial state with some entangled states, and that this initial state is describable as a mixed or pure state in a Hilbert space H. After a certain amount of time, the system is divided in two parts each of which contains some non-entangled states and half of the quantum entangled states, and the two parts become spatially distinct, A and B, sent to two distinct observers, Alice and Bob, who are free to perform quantum mechanical measurements on their portion of the total system (viz, A and B). The question is: is there any action that Alice can perform on A that would be detectable by Bob making an observation of B? The theorem replies 'no'.

An important assumption going into the theorem is that neither Alice nor Bob is allowed, in any way, to affect the preparation of the initial state. If Alice were allowed to take part in the preparation of the initial state, it would be trivially easy for her to encode a message into it; thus neither Alice nor Bob participates in the preparation of the initial state. The theorem does not require that the initial state be somehow 'random' or 'balanced' or 'uniform': indeed, a third party preparing the initial state could easily encode messages in it, received by Alice and Bob. Simply, the theorem states that, given some initial state, prepared in some way, there is no action that Alice can take that would be detectable by Bob.

The proof proceeds by defining how the total Hilbert space H can be split into two parts, H_{A} and H_{B}, describing the subspaces accessible to Alice and Bob. The total state of the system is described by a density matrix σ. The goal of the theorem is to prove that Bob cannot in any way distinguish the pre-measurement state σ from the post-measurement state P(σ). This is accomplished mathematically by comparing the trace of σ and the trace of P(σ), with the trace being taken over the subspace H_{A}. Since the trace is only over a subspace, it is technically called a partial trace. Key to this step is that the (partial) trace adequately summarizes the system from Bob's point of view. That is, everything that Bob has access to, or could ever have access to, measure, or detect, is completely described by a partial trace over H_{A} of the system σ. The fact that this trace never changes as Alice performs her measurements is the conclusion of the proof of the no-communication theorem.

== Formulation ==
The proof of the theorem is commonly illustrated for the setup of Bell tests in which two observers Alice and Bob perform local observations on a common bipartite system, and uses the statistical machinery of quantum mechanics, namely density states and quantum operations.

Alice and Bob perform measurements on system S whose underlying Hilbert space is
$$H = H_A \otimes H_B.$$

It is also assumed that everything is finite-dimensional to avoid convergence issues. The state of the composite system is given by a density operator on H. Any density operator σ on H is a sum of the form:
$$\sigma = \sum_i T_i \otimes S_i$$
where T_{i} and S_{i} are operators on H_{A} and H_{B} respectively. For the following, it is not required to assume that T_{i} and S_{i} are state projection operators: i.e. they need not necessarily be non-negative, nor have a trace of one. That is, σ can have a definition somewhat broader than that of a density matrix; the theorem still holds. Note that the theorem holds trivially for separable states. If the shared state σ is separable, it is clear that any local operation by Alice will leave Bob's system intact. Thus the point of the theorem is no communication can be achieved via a shared entangled state.

Alice performs a local measurement on her subsystem. In general, this is described by a quantum operation, on the system state, of the following kind
$$P(\sigma) = \sum_k (V_k \otimes I_{H_B})^* \ \sigma \ (V_k \otimes I_{H_B}),$$
where V_{k} are called Kraus matrices which satisfy
$$\sum_k V_k V_k^* = I_{H_A}.$$

The term
$$I_{H_B}$$
from the expression
$$(V_k \otimes I_{H_B})$$
means that Alice's measurement apparatus does not interact with Bob's subsystem.

Supposing the combined system is prepared in state σ and assuming, for purposes of argument, a non-relativistic situation, immediately (with no time delay) after Alice performs her measurement, the relative state of Bob's system is given by the partial trace of the overall state with respect to Alice's system. In symbols, the relative state of Bob's system after Alice's operation is
$$\operatorname{tr}_{H_A}(P(\sigma))$$
where $\operatorname{tr}_{H_A}$ is the partial trace mapping with respect to Alice's system.

One can directly calculate this state:
$$\begin{align}
\operatorname{tr}_{H_A}(P(\sigma))
& = \operatorname{tr}_{H_A} \left(\sum_k (V_k \otimes I_{H_B})^* \sigma (V_k \otimes I_{H_B} )\right) \\
& = \operatorname{tr}_{H_A} \left(\sum_k \sum_i V_k^* T_i V_k \otimes S_i \right)\\
& = \sum_i \sum_k \operatorname{tr}(V_k^* T_i V_k) S_i \\
& = \sum_i \sum_k \operatorname{tr}(T_i V_k V_k^*) S_i \\
&  = \sum_i \operatorname{tr}\left(T_i \sum_k V_k V_k^*\right) S_i \\
& = \sum_i \operatorname{tr}(T_i)  S_i \\
& = \operatorname{tr}_{H_A}(\sigma).
\end{align}$$

From this it is argued that, statistically, Bob cannot tell the difference between what Alice did and a random measurement (or whether she did anything at all).

== Some comments ==
- The no-communication theorem implies the no-cloning theorem, which states that quantum states cannot be (perfectly) copied. That is, cloning is a sufficient condition for the communication of classical information to occur. To see this, suppose that quantum states could be cloned. Assume parts of a maximally entangled Bell state are distributed to Alice and Bob. Alice could send bits to Bob in the following way: If Alice wishes to transmit a "0", she measures the spin of her electron in the z direction, collapsing Bob's state to either $|z+\rangle_B$ or $|z-\rangle_B$. To transmit "1", Alice does nothing to her qubit. Bob creates many copies of his electron's state, and measures the spin of each copy in the z direction. Bob will know that Alice has transmitted a "0" if all his measurements will produce the same result; otherwise, his measurements will have outcomes $|z+\rangle_B$ or $|z-\rangle_B$ with equal probability. This would allow Alice and Bob to communicate classical bits between each other (possibly across space-like separations, violating causality).
- The version of the no-communication theorem discussed in this article assumes that the quantum system shared by Alice and Bob is a composite system, i.e. that its underlying Hilbert space is a tensor product whose first factor describes the part of the system that Alice can interact with and whose second factor describes the part of the system that Bob can interact with. In quantum field theory, this assumption can be replaced by the assumption that Alice and Bob are spacelike separated. This alternate version of the no-communication theorem shows that faster-than-light communication cannot be achieved using processes which obey the rules of quantum field theory.

== History ==
In 1978, Phillippe H. Eberhard's paper, Bell's Theorem and the Different Concepts of Locality, rigorously demonstrated the impossibility of faster-than-light communication through quantum systems. Eberhard introduced several mathematical concepts of locality and showed how quantum mechanics contradicts most of them while preserving causality.

Further, in 1988, the paper Quantum Field Theory Cannot Provide Faster-Than-Light Communication by Eberhard and Ronald R. Ross analyzed how relativistic quantum field theory inherently forbids faster-than-light communication. This work elaborates on how misinterpretations of quantum field properties had led to claims of superluminal communication and pinpoints the mathematical principles that prevent it.

In regards to communication, a quantum channel can always be used to transfer classical information by means of shared quantum states. In 2008 Matthew Hastings proved a counterexample where the minimum output entropy is not additive for all quantum channels. Therefore, by an equivalence result due to Peter Shor, the Holevo capacity is not just additive, but super-additive like the entropy, and by consequence there may be some quantum channels where you can transfer more than the classical capacity. Typically overall communication happens at the same time via quantum and non quantum channels, and in general time ordering and causality cannot be violated.

In August 24, 2015, a team led by physicist Ronald Hanson from Delft University of Technology in the Netherlands uploaded their latest paper to the preprint website arXiv, reporting the first Bell experiment that simultaneously addressed both the detection loophole and the communication loophole. The research team used a clever technique known as "entanglement swapping", which combines the benefits of photons and matter particles. The final measurements showed coherence between the two electrons that exceeded the Bell limit, once again supporting the standard view of quantum mechanics and rejecting Einstein's hidden variable theory. Furthermore, since electrons are easily detectable, the detection loophole is no longer an issue, and the large distance between the two electrons also eliminates the communication loophole.

== See also ==
- No-broadcasting theorem
- No-deleting theorem
- No-hiding theorem
- No-teleportation theorem
