= Jeffrey Mandula =

American physicist (b. 1941)

Jeffrey E Mandula
- Education: Harvard University
- Scientific career
- Workplaces: Washington University; MIT
- Doctoral advisor: Sidney Coleman

Jeffrey Ellis Mandula (born 1941 in New York City) is a physicist well known for the Coleman–Mandula theorem from 1967. He got his Ph.D. 1966 under Sidney Coleman at Harvard University. Thereafter he was a professor of applied mathematics at Massachusetts Institute of Technology School of Science and then of physics in the Arts and Sciences at Washington University in St. Louis. Today, he is responsible for the funding of science in the U.S. Department of Energy.
