= Simone Severini =

Italian computer scientist

- Education: University of Bristol (PhD)
- Alma mater: University of Florence
- Known for: Braunstein-Ghosh-Severini Entropy; Induced gravity Quantum contextuality
- Awards: Royal Society University Research Fellowship; Newton International Fellowship
- Scientific career
- Fields: Physics, Computer Science, Quantum Computing
- Institutions: UCL; Institute for Quantum Computing
- Doctoral advisor: Richard Jozsa
- Website: www.ucl.ac.uk/~ucapsse

Simone Severini is an Italian-born British computer scientist. He is currently Distinguished Engineer at Google, and Professor of Physics of Information at University College London. In 2018 he founded the Quantum Computing program at Amazon Web Services and served as its General Manager. In 2015 he was the technical co-founder and one of the first scientific advisors of Cambridge Quantum Computing, with Béla Bollobás, Imre Leader, and Fernando Brandão. He co-founded Phasecraft, with Toby Cubitt, Ashley Montanaro, and John Morton.

His academic research applied graph and network theory to quantum physics. With Adan Cabello and Andreas Winter, he developed a framework for quantum contextuality, and with Tomasz Konopka, Fotini Markopoulou, and Lee Smolin, he introduced quantum graphity, a random graph model of spacetime. He also co-introduced the Braunstein–Ghosh–Severini entropy. Severini serves on the Strategic Advisory Board of the Lean Focused Research Organization (FRO), a non-profit organization supporting the development of the Lean proof assistant and its ecosystem.
