= Action at a distance =

Concept in physics

Action at a distance is the concept in physics that an object's motion can be affected by another object without the two being in physical contact; that is, it is the concept of the non-local interaction of objects that are separated in space. Coulomb's law and Newton's law of universal gravitation are based on action at a distance.

Historically, action at a distance was the earliest scientific model for gravity and electricity and it continues to be useful in many practical cases. In the 19th and 20th centuries, field models arose to explain these phenomena with more precision. The discovery of electrons and of special relativity led to new action at a distance models providing alternatives to field theories. Under the modern understanding, the four fundamental interactions (gravity, electromagnetism, the strong interaction and the weak interaction) in all of physics are not described by action at a distance.

== Categories of action ==
In the study of mechanics, action at a distance is one of three fundamental actions on matter that cause motion. The other two are direct impact (elastic or inelastic collisions) and actions in a continuous medium as in fluid mechanics or solid mechanics. Historically, physical explanations for particular phenomena have moved between these three categories over time as new models were developed.

Action-at-a-distance and actions in a continuous medium may be easily distinguished when the medium dynamics are visible, like waves in water or in an elastic solid. In the case of electricity or gravity, no medium is required. In the nineteenth century, criteria like the effect of actions on intervening matter, the observation of a time delay, the apparent storage of energy, or even the possibility of a plausible mechanical model for action transmission were all accepted as evidence against action at a distance. Aether theories were alternative proposals to replace apparent action-at-a-distance in gravity and electromagnetism, in terms of continuous action inside an (invisible) medium called "aether".

Direct impact of macroscopic objects seems visually distinguishable from action at a distance. If however the objects are constructed of atoms, and the volume of those atoms is not defined and atoms interact by electric and magnetic forces, the distinction is less clear.

== Roles ==
The concept of action at a distance acts in multiple roles in physics and it can co-exist with other models according to the needs of each physical problem.

One role is as a summary of physical phenomena, independent of any understanding of the cause of such an action. For example, astronomical tables of planetary positions can be compactly summarized using Newton's law of universal gravitation, which assumes the planets interact without contact or an intervening medium. As a summary of data, the concept does not need to be evaluated as a plausible physical model.

Action at a distance also acts as a model explaining physical phenomena even in the presence of other models. Again in the case of gravity, hypothesizing an instantaneous force between masses allows the return time of comets to be predicted as well as predicting the existence of previously unknown planets, like Neptune. These triumphs of physics predated the alternative more accurate model for gravity based on general relativity by many decades.

Introductory physics textbooks discuss central forces, like gravity, by models based on action-at-distance without discussing the cause of such forces or issues with it until the topics of relativity and fields are discussed. For example, see The Feynman Lectures on Physics on gravity.

== History ==
=== Early inquiries into motion ===
Action-at-a-distance as a physical concept requires identifying objects, distances, and their motion. In antiquity, ideas about the natural world were not organized in these terms. Objects in motion were modeled as living beings. Around 1600, the scientific method began to take root. René Descartes held a more fundamental view, developing ideas of matter and action independent of theology. Galileo Galilei wrote about experimental measurements of falling and rolling objects. Johannes Kepler's laws of planetary motion summarized Tycho Brahe's astronomical observations. Many experiments with electrical and magnetic materials led to new ideas about forces. These efforts set the stage for Newton's work on forces and gravity.

=== Newtonian gravity ===
In 1687 Isaac Newton published his Principia which combined his laws of motion with a new mathematical analysis able to reproduce Kepler's empirical results. His explanation was in the form of a law of universal gravitation: any two bodies are attracted by a force proportional to their mass and inversely proportional to the square of the distance between them. Thus the motions of planets were predicted by assuming forces working over great distances.

This mathematical expression of the force did not imply a cause. Newton considered action-at-a-distance to be an inadequate model for gravity. Newton, in his words, considered action at a distance to be:

so great an Absurdity that I believe no Man who has in philosophical Matters a competent Faculty of thinking can ever fall into it.

— Isaac Newton, Letters to Bentley, 1692/3

Metaphysical scientists of the early 1700s strongly objected to the unexplained action-at-a-distance in Newton's theory. Gottfried Wilhelm Leibniz complained that the mechanism of gravity was "invisible, intangible, and not mechanical". Moreover, initial comparisons with astronomical data were not favorable. As mathematical techniques improved throughout the 1700s, the theory showed increasing success, predicting the date of the return of Halley's Comet and aiding the discovery of planet Neptune in 1846. These successes and the increasingly empirical focus of science towards the 19th century led to acceptance of Newton's theory of gravity despite distaste for action-at-a-distance.

=== Electrical action at a distance ===
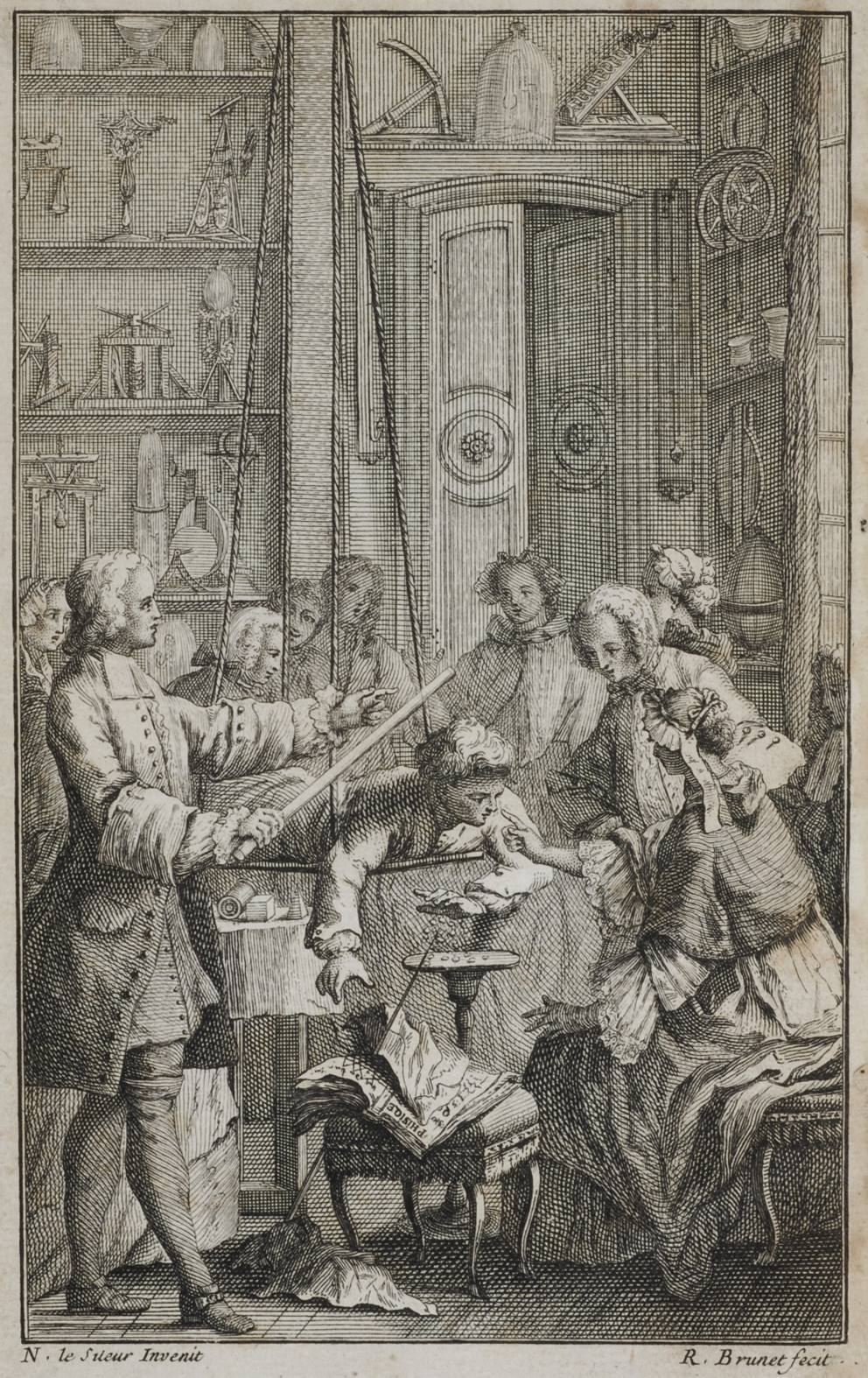
Jean-Antoine Nollet reproducing Stephan Gray's "electric boy" experiment, in which a boy hanging from insulating silk ropes is given an electric charge. A group are gathered around. A woman is encouraged to bend forward and poke the boy's nose, to get an electric shock.

Electrical and magnetic phenomena also began to be explored systematically in the early 1600s. In William Gilbert's early theory of "electric effluvia," a kind of electric atmosphere, he rules out action-at-a-distance on the grounds that "no action can be performed by matter save by contact". However subsequent experiments, especially those by Stephen Gray showed electrical effects over distance. Gray developed an experiment call the "electric boy" demonstrating electric transfer without direct contact. Franz Aepinus was the first to show, in 1759, that a theory of action at a distance for electricity provides a simpler replacement for the electric effluvia theory. Despite this success, Aepinus himself considered the nature of the forces to be unexplained: he did "not approve of the doctrine which assumes the possibility of action at a distance", setting the stage for a shift to theories based on aether.

By 1785 Charles-Augustin de Coulomb showed that two electric charges at rest experience a force inversely proportional to the square of the distance between them, a result now called Coulomb's law. The striking similarity to gravity strengthened the case for action at a distance, at least as a mathematical model.

As mathematical methods improved, especially through the work of Pierre-Simon Laplace, Joseph-Louis Lagrange, and Siméon Denis Poisson, more sophisticated mathematical methods began to influence the thinking of scientists. The concept of potential energy applied to small test particles led to the concept of a scalar field, a mathematical model representing the forces throughout space. While this mathematical model is not a mechanical medium, the mental picture of such a field resembles a medium.

=== Fields as an alternative ===
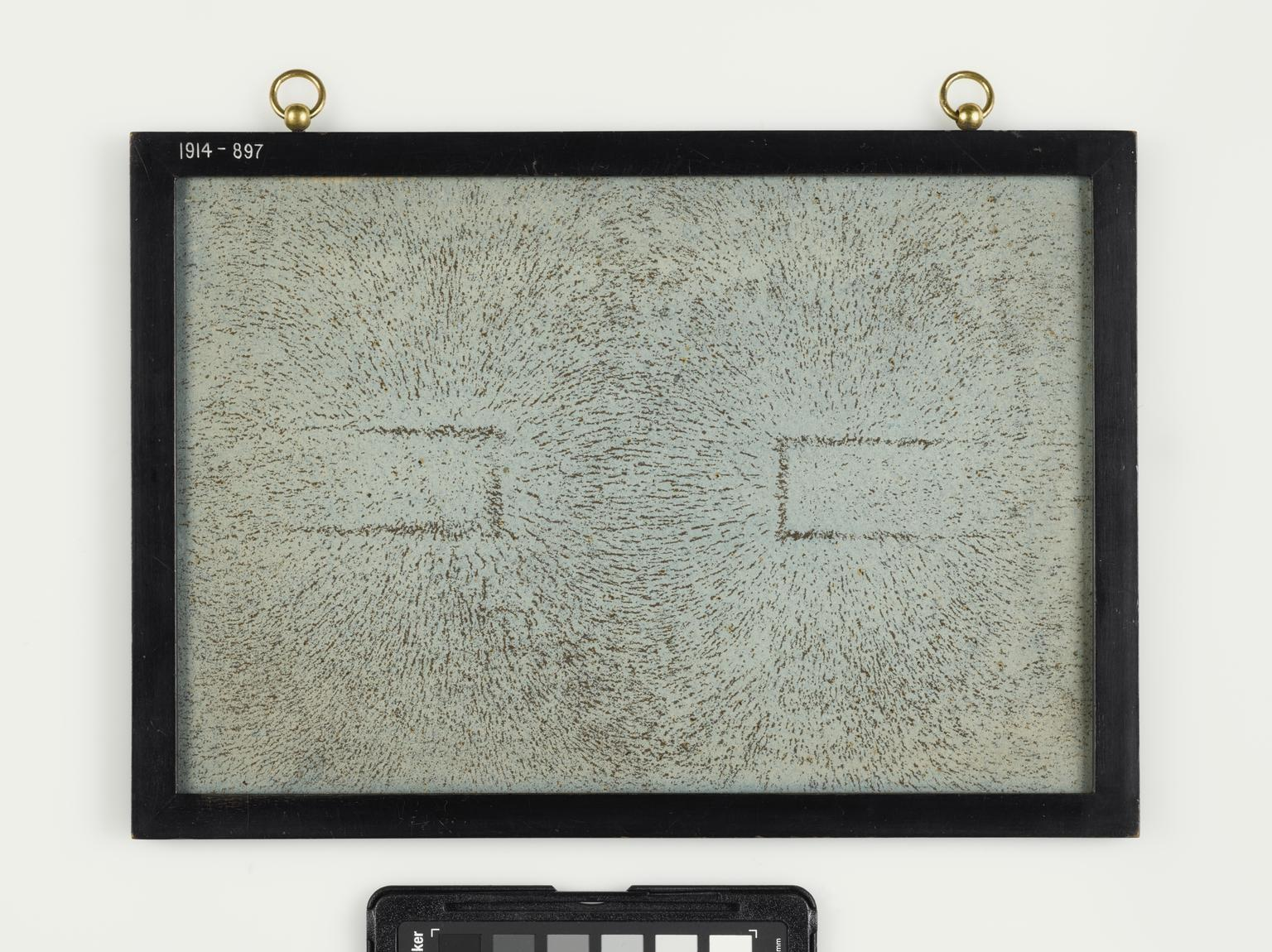
Glazed frame, containing "Delineation of Lines of Magnetic Force by Iron filings" prepared by Michael Faraday

Michael Faraday was the first who suggested that action at a distance was inadequate as an account of electric and magnetic forces, even in the form of a (mathematical) potential field. Faraday, an empirical experimentalist, cited three reasons in support of some medium transmitting electrical force: 1) electrostatic induction across an insulator depends on the nature of the insulator, 2) cutting a charged insulator causes opposite charges to appear on each half, and 3) electric discharge sparks are curved at an insulator. From these reasons he concluded that the particles of an insulator must be polarized, with each particle contributing to continuous action. He also experimented with magnets, demonstrating lines of force made visible by iron filings. However, in both cases his field-like model depends on particles that interact through an action-at-a-distance: his mechanical field-like model has no more fundamental physical cause than the long-range central field model.

Faraday's observations, as well as others, led James Clerk Maxwell to a breakthrough formulation in 1865, a set of equations that combined electricity and magnetism, both static and dynamic, and which included electromagnetic radiation – light. Maxwell started with elaborate mechanical models but ultimately produced a purely mathematical treatment using dynamical vector fields. The sense that these fields must be set to vibrate to propagate light set off a search of a medium of propagation; the medium was called the luminiferous aether or the aether.

In 1873 Maxwell addressed action at a distance explicitly. He reviews Faraday's lines of force, carefully pointing out that Faraday himself did not provide a mechanical model of these lines in terms of a medium. Nevertheless, the many properties of these lines of force imply these "lines must not be regarded as mere mathematical abstractions". Faraday himself viewed these lines of force as a model, a "valuable aid" to the experimentalist, a means to suggest further experiments.

In distinguishing between different kinds of action Faraday suggested three criteria: 1) do additional material objects alter the action?, 2) does the action take time, and 3) does it depend upon the receiving end? For electricity, Faraday knew that all three criteria were met for electric action, but gravity was thought to only meet the third one. After Maxwell's time a fourth criteria, the transmission of energy, was added, thought to also apply to electricity but not gravity. With the advent of new theories of gravity, the modern account would give gravity all of the criteria except dependence on additional objects.

=== Fields fade into spacetime ===
The success of Maxwell's field equations led to numerous efforts in the later decades of the 19th century to represent electrical, magnetic, and gravitational fields, primarily with mechanical models. No model emerged that explained the existing phenomena. In particular no good model for stellar aberration, the shift in the position of stars with the Earth's relative velocity. The best models required the ether to be stationary while the Earth moved, but experimental efforts to measure the effect of Earth's motion through the aether found no effect.

In 1892 Hendrik Lorentz proposed a modified aether based on the emerging microscopic molecular model rather than the strictly macroscopic continuous theory of Maxwell. Lorentz investigated the mutual interaction of a moving solitary electrons within a stationary aether. He rederived Maxwell's equations in this way but, critically, in the process he changed them to represent the wave in the coordinates moving electrons. He showed that the wave equations had the same form if they were transformed using a particular scaling factor,
$$\gamma = \frac{1}{\sqrt{1-(u^2/c^2)}}.$$
where $u$ is the velocity of the moving electrons and $c$ is the speed of light. Lorentz noted that if this factor were applied as a length contraction to moving matter in a stationary ether, it would eliminate any effect of motion through the ether, in agreement with experiment.

In 1899, Henri Poincaré questioned the existence of an aether, showing that the principle of relativity prohibits the absolute motion assumed by proponents of the aether model. He named the transformation used by Lorentz the Lorentz transformation but interpreted it as a transformation between two inertial frames with relative velocity $u$. This transformation makes the electromagnetic equations look the same in every uniformly moving inertial frame. Then, in 1905, Albert Einstein demonstrated that the principle of relativity, applied to the simultaneity of time and the constant speed of light, precisely predicts the Lorentz transformation. This theory of special relativity quickly became the modern concept of spacetime.

Thus the aether model, initially so very different from action at a distance, slowly changed to resemble simple empty space.

In 1905, Poincaré proposed gravitational waves, emanating from a body and propagating at the speed of light, as being required by the Lorentz transformations and suggested that, in analogy to an accelerating electrical charge producing electromagnetic waves, accelerated masses in a relativistic field theory of gravity should produce gravitational waves. However, until 1915 gravity stood apart as a force still described by action-at-a-distance. In that year, Einstein showed that a field theory of spacetime, general relativity, consistent with relativity can explain gravity. New effects resulting from this theory were dramatic for cosmology but minor for planetary motion and physics on Earth. Einstein himself noted Newton's "enormous practical success".

In the 1960s, the no-interaction theorem was proved, ruling out many classical action-at-a-distance theories that violate relativity. The theorem suggest that particles can only interact locally by the introduction of fields.

== Modern action at a distance ==
In the early decades of the 20th century, Karl Schwarzschild, Hugo Tetrode, and Adriaan Fokker independently developed non-instantaneous models for action at a distance consistent with special relativity. In 1949 John Archibald Wheeler and Richard Feynman built on these models to develop a new field-free theory of electromagnetism. While Maxwell's field equations are generally successful, the Lorentz model of a moving electron interacting with the field encounters mathematical difficulties: the self-energy of the moving point charge within the field is infinite. The Wheeler–Feynman absorber theory of electromagnetism avoids the self-energy issue. They interpret Abraham–Lorentz force, the apparent force resisting electron acceleration, as a real force returning from all the other existing charges in the universe.

The Wheeler–Feynman theory has inspired new thinking about the arrow of time and about the nature of quantum non-locality. The theory has implications for cosmology; it has been extended to quantum mechanics. A similar approach has been applied to develop an alternative theory of gravity consistent with general relativity. John G. Cramer has extended the Wheeler–Feynman ideas to create the transactional interpretation of quantum mechanics.

== "Spooky action at a distance" ==
Though Albert Einstein played a pivotal role in the development of quantum mechanics, he himself never fully accepted the theory. While he recognized that it made correct predictions, he believed a more fundamental description of nature must be possible. Over the years he presented multiple arguments to this effect, but the one he preferred most dated to a debate with Bohr in 1930. Einstein suggested a thought experiment in which two objects are allowed to interact and then moved apart a great distance from each other. The quantum-mechanical description of the two objects is a mathematical entity known as a wavefunction. If the wavefunction that describes the two objects before their interaction is given, then the Schrödinger equation provides the wavefunction that describes them after their interaction. But because of what would later be called quantum entanglement, measuring one object would lead to an instantaneous change of the wavefunction describing the other object, no matter how far away it is. Moreover, the choice of which measurement to perform upon the first object would affect what wavefunction could result for the second object. Einstein reasoned that no influence could propagate from the first object to the second instantaneously fast. Indeed, he argued, physics depends on being able to tell one thing apart from another, and such instantaneous influences would call that into question. Because the true "physical condition" of the second object could not be immediately altered by an action done to the first, Einstein concluded, the wavefunction could not be that true physical condition, only an incomplete description of it.

In 1947, Einstein expressed his dissatisfaction with quantum theory in a letter to Max Born. "I cannot seriously believe in" quantum mechanics, he wrote, "because the theory cannot be reconciled with the idea that physics should represent a reality in time and space, free from spooky actions at a distance."

In 1964, John Stewart Bell carried the analysis of quantum entanglement much further by proving the first version of Bell's theorem. In the context of Bell's theorem, "local" refers to the principle of locality, the idea that a particle can only be influenced by its immediate surroundings, and that interactions mediated by physical fields cannot propagate faster than the speed of light. "Hidden variables" are supposed properties of quantum particles that are not included in quantum theory but nevertheless affect the outcome of experiments. In the words of Bell, "If [a hidden-variable theory] is local it will not agree with quantum mechanics, and if it agrees with quantum mechanics it will not be local."

In his original paper, Bell deduced that if measurements are performed independently on the two separated particles of an entangled pair, then the assumption that the outcomes depend upon hidden variables within each half implies a mathematical constraint on how the outcomes on the two measurements are correlated. Such a constraint would later be named a Bell inequality. Bell then showed that quantum physics predicts correlations that violate this inequality. Multiple variations on Bell's theorem were put forward in the years following his original paper, using different assumptions and obtaining different Bell (or "Bell-type") inequalities.

The phrase "spooky action at a distance" has been adopted to describe the violation of Bell inequalities. Whether these phenomena involve real action at a distance, or in other words whether the need for nonlocality in hidden-variable models implies true nonlocality in nature, is a subject of debate.

== Force in quantum field theory ==
Quantum field theory does not need action at a distance. At the most fundamental level, only four forces are needed. Each force is described as resulting from the exchange of specific bosons. Two are short range: the strong interaction mediated by mesons and the weak interaction mediated by the weak boson; two are long range: electromagnetism mediated by the photon and gravity hypothesized to be mediated by the graviton. However, the entire concept of force is of secondary concern in advanced modern particle physics. Energy forms the basis of physical models and the word action has shifted away from implying a force to a specific technical meaning, an integral over the difference between potential energy and kinetic energy.

== See also ==
- Central force – Mechanical force towards or away from a point
- Principle of locality – Physical principle that only immediate surroundings can influence an object
- Quantum nonlocality – Deviations from local realism
