= Peter Goddard (physicist) =

British mathematical physicist

- Born: 3 September 1945 (age 81)
- Education: Emanuel School and the University of Cambridge
- Occupations: Professor, Institute for Advanced Study, Princeton, NJ
- Known for: GKO construction
- Awards: Mayhew Prize (1967)

Peter Goddard CBE FRS (born 3 September 1945) is a British mathematical physicist who works in string theory and conformal field theory. Among his many contributions to these fields is the Goddard–Thorn theorem (proved together with Charles Thorn).

== Biography ==
Goddard was educated at Emanuel School and Trinity College, Cambridge. At the University of Cambridge, he was a professor in the Department of Applied Mathematics and Theoretical Physics (DAMTP), and founding deputy director of the Isaac Newton Institute for Mathematical Sciences. He was Master of St John's College, Cambridge, from 1994 until 2004. He was Director of the Institute for Advanced Study from January 2004 through June 2012. He is now a professor in the Institute's School of Natural Sciences.

He was elected to the Royal Society in 1989, was awarded the Dirac Medal and Medal of the International Centre for Theoretical Physics in 1997, and was made a Commander of the Order of the British Empire in 2002.

Academic offices
Preceded by Robert Aubrey Hinde	Master of St John's College, Cambridge; 1994–2004	Succeeded by Richard Perham
