= Braunstein–Ghosh–Severini entropy =

In network theory, the Braunstein–Ghosh–Severini entropy (BGS entropy) of a network is the von Neumann entropy of a density matrix given by a normalized Laplacian matrix of the network. This definition of entropy does not have a clear thermodynamical interpretation. The BGS entropy has been used in the context of quantum gravity.
