= No-broadcasting theorem =

Theorem of quantum information processing

In physics, the no-broadcasting theorem is a result of quantum information theory. In the case of pure quantum states, it is a corollary of the no-cloning theorem. The no-cloning theorem for pure states says that it is impossible to create two copies of an unknown state given a single copy of the state. Since quantum states cannot be copied in general, they cannot be broadcast. Here, the word "broadcast" is used in the sense of conveying the state to two or more recipients. For multiple recipients to each receive the state, there must be, in some sense, a way of duplicating the state. The no-broadcast theorem generalizes the no-cloning theorem for mixed states.

The theorem also includes a converse: if two quantum states do commute, there is a method for broadcasting them: they must have a common basis of eigenstates diagonalizing them simultaneously, and the map that clones every state of this basis is a legitimate quantum operation, requiring only physical resources independent of the input state to implement—a completely positive map. A corollary is that there is a physical process capable of broadcasting every state in some set of quantum states if, and only if, every pair of states in the set commutes. This broadcasting map, which works in the commuting case, produces an overall state in which the two copies are perfectly correlated in their eigenbasis.

Remarkably, the theorem does not hold if more than one copy of the initial state is provided: for example, broadcasting six copies starting from four copies of the original state is allowed, even if the states are drawn from a non-commuting set. The purity of the state can even be increased in the process, a phenomenon known as superbroadcasting.

== Generalized no-broadcast theorem ==
The generalized quantum no-broadcasting theorem, originally proven by Barnum, Caves, Fuchs, Jozsa and Schumacher for mixed states of finite-dimensional quantum systems, says that given a pair of quantum states which do not commute, there is no method capable of taking a single copy of either state and succeeding, no matter which state was supplied and without incorporating knowledge of which state has been supplied, in producing a state such that one part of it is the same as the original state and the other part is also the same as the original state. That is, given an initial unknown state $\rho_i,$ drawn from the set $\{\rho_i\}_{i \in \{1,2\}}$ such that $[\rho_1,\rho_2] \ne 0$, there is no process (using physical means independent of those used to select the state) guaranteed to create a state $\rho_{AB}$ in a Hilbert space $H_A \otimes H_B$ whose partial traces are $\operatorname{Tr}_A\rho_{AB} = \rho_i$ and $\operatorname{Tr}_B\rho_{AB} = \rho_i$. Such a process was termed broadcasting in that paper.

== No-local-broadcasting theorem ==
The second theorem states that local broadcasting is only possible when the state is a classical probability distribution. This means that a state can only be broadcast locally if it does not have any quantum correlations. Luo reconciled this theorem with the generalized no-broadcast theorem by making the conjecture that when a state is a classical-quantum state, correlations (rather than the state itself) in a bipartite state can be locally broadcast. By mathematically proving that his conjecture and the two theorems all relate to and imply one another, Luo proved that all three statements are logically equivalent.

== See also ==
- No-communication theorem
- No-hiding theorem
- Quantum teleportation
- Quantum entanglement
- Quantum information
- Uncertainty principle
