= No-hiding theorem =

Theorem of quantum information theory

The no-hiding theorem states that if information is lost from a system via decoherence, then it moves to the subspace of the environment and it cannot remain in the correlation between the system and the environment. This is a fundamental consequence of the linearity and unitarity of quantum mechanics. Thus, information is never lost in unitary, non wave function collapse interpretations of quantum mechanics. This has implications in the black hole information paradox and in fact any process that appears to lose information completely. The no-hiding theorem is robust to imperfection in the physical process that seemingly destroys the original information.

This was proved by Samuel L. Braunstein and Arun K. Pati in 2007. In 2011, the no-hiding theorem was experimentally tested using nuclear magnetic resonance devices where a single qubit undergoes complete randomization; i.e., a pure state transforms to a random mixed state. Subsequently, the lost information has been recovered from the ancilla qubits using suitable local unitary transformation only in the environment Hilbert space in accordance with the no-hiding theorem. This experiment for the first time demonstrated the conservation of quantum information.

== Formal statement ==
Let $|\psi\rangle$ be an arbitrary quantum state in some Hilbert space and let there be a physical process that transforms $|\psi\rangle \langle \psi | \rightarrow \rho$ with $\rho = \sum_k p_k |k\rangle \langle k|$.
If $\rho$ is independent of the input state $|\psi\rangle$, then in the enlarged Hilbert space the mapping is of the form
$$|\psi\rangle \otimes  |A\rangle \rightarrow \sum_k \sqrt{p_k} |k \rangle \otimes |A_k(\psi) \rangle = \sum_k \sqrt{p_k} |k \rangle \otimes (|q_k \rangle \otimes |\psi\rangle \oplus 0),$$
where $|A\rangle$ is the initial state of the environment, $|A_k(\psi) \rangle$'s are the orthonormal basis of the environment Hilbert space and $\oplus 0$ denotes the fact that one may augment the unused dimension of the environment Hilbert space by zero vectors.

The proof of the no-hiding theorem is based on the linearity and the unitarity of quantum mechanics. The original information which is missing from the final state simply remains in the subspace of the environmental Hilbert space. Also, note that the original information is not in the correlation between the system and the environment. This is the essence of the no-hiding theorem. One can in principle, recover the lost information from the environment by local unitary transformations acting only on the environment Hilbert space. The no-hiding theorem provides new insights to the nature of quantum information. For example, if classical information is lost from one system it may either move to another system or can be hidden in the correlation between a pair of bit strings. However, quantum information cannot be completely hidden in correlations between a pair of subsystems. Quantum mechanics allows only one way to completely hide an arbitrary quantum state from one of its subsystems. If it is lost from one subsystem, then it moves to other subsystems.

== Conservation of quantum information ==
In physics, conservation laws play important roles. For example, the law of conservation of energy states that the energy of a closed system must remain constant. It can neither increase nor decrease without coming in contact with an external system. If we consider the whole universe as a closed system, the total amount of energy always remains the same. However, the form of energy keeps changing. One may wonder if there is any such law for the conservation of information. In the classical world, information can be copied and deleted perfectly. In the quantum world, however, the conservation of quantum information should mean that information cannot be created nor destroyed. This concept stems from two fundamental theorems of quantum mechanics: the no-cloning theorem and the no-deleting theorem. But the no-hiding theorem is a more general proof of conservation of quantum information which originates from the proof of conservation of wave function in quantum theory.

It may be noted that the conservation of entropy holds for a quantum system undergoing unitary time evolution and that if entropy represents information in quantum theory, then it is believed then that information should somehow be conserved. For example, one can prove that pure states remain pure states and probabilistic combinations of pure states (called as mixed states) remain mixed states under unitary evolution. However, it was never proved that if the probability amplitude disappears from one system, it will reappear in another system. Now, using the no-hiding theorem one can make a precise statement. One may say that as energy keeps changing its form, the wave function keep moving from one Hilbert space to another Hilbert space. Since the wave function contains all the relevant information about a physical system, the conservation of wave function is tantamount to conservation of quantum information.
