= List of quantum processors =

This list contains quantum processors, also known as quantum processing units (QPUs). Some devices listed below have only been announced at press conferences so far, with no actual demonstrations or scientific publications characterizing the performance.

Quantum processors are difficult to compare due to the different architectures and approaches. Due to this, published physical qubit numbers do not reflect the performance levels of the processor. This is instead achieved through the number of logical qubits or benchmarking metrics such as quantum volume, randomized benchmarking or circuit layer operations per second (CLOPS).

== Circuit-based quantum processors ==
These QPUs are based on the quantum circuit and quantum logic gate-based model of computing.

Manufacturer	Name/codename designation	Architecture	Layout	Fidelity (%)	Qubits (physical)	Release date	Quantum volume
Alpine Quantum Technologies	PINE System	Trapped ion			24	June 7, 2021	128
Alpine Quantum Technologies	MARMOT	Trapped ion	Fully connected	99.96 (1 qubit); 98.5 (2 qubits)	20		128
Alpine Quantum Technologies	IBEX Q1	Trapped ion	Fully connected	99.97 (1 qubit); 98.7 (2 qubits)	12		128
Alpine Quantum Technologies	LYNX	Trapped ion			At least 15	May 5, 2026	32768
Atom Computing	Phoenix	Neutral atoms in optical lattices			100	August 10, 2021	
Atom Computing	—N/a	Neutral atoms in optical lattices	35×35 lattice (with 45 vacancies)	< 99.5 (2 qubits)	1180	October 2023	
CAS	Xiaohong	Superconducting	—N/a	—N/a	504	2024	
Google	—N/a	Superconducting	—N/a	99.5	20	2017	
Google	—N/a	Superconducting	7×7 lattice	99.7	49	Q4 2017 (planned)	
Google	Bristlecone	Superconducting transmon	6×12 lattice	99 (readout); 99.9 (1 qubit); 99.4 (2 qubits)	72	March 5, 2018	
Google	Sycamore	Superconducting transmon	9×6 lattice	—N/a	53 effective (54 total)	2019	
Google	Willow	Superconducting transmon	rotated rectangular lattice (see spec sheet)	99.965% (1-qubit), 99.67% (2-qubit), surface code error correction implemented	105	December 9, 2024	
HRL Laboratories, LLC	Digitally controlled silicon quantum processing unit	Semiconductor silicon exchange-only spin qubits	3×6 square lattice, nearest-neighbor coupling	99.983 (1-qubit mean); 99.65 (CNOT mean); 99.91 (best reproducible CNOT)	18 (Up to)	July 29, 2026	
IBM	IBM Q 5 Tenerife	Superconducting	bow tie	99.897 (average gate); 98.64 (readout)	5	2016	
IBM	IBM Q 5 Yorktown	Superconducting	bow tie	99.545 (average gate); 94.2 (readout)	5		
IBM	IBM Q 14 Melbourne	Superconducting	—N/a	99.735 (average gate); 97.13 (readout)	14		
IBM	IBM Q 16 Rüschlikon	Superconducting	2×8 lattice	99.779 (average gate); 94.24 (readout)	16	May 17, 2017 (Retired: 26 September 2018)	
IBM	IBM Q 17	Superconducting	—N/a	—N/a	17	May 17, 2017	
IBM	IBM Q 20 Tokyo	Superconducting	5×4 lattice	99.812 (average gate); 93.21 (readout)	20	November 10, 2017	
IBM	IBM Q 20 Austin	Superconducting	5×4 lattice	—N/a	20	(Retired: 4 July 2018)	
IBM	IBM Q 50 prototype	Superconducting transmon	—N/a	—N/a	50		
IBM	IBM Q 53	Superconducting	—N/a	—N/a	53	October 2019	
IBM	IBM Eagle	Superconducting transmon	—N/a	—N/a	127	November 2021	
IBM	IBM Osprey	Superconducting	—N/a	—N/a	433	November 2022	
IBM	IBM Condor	Superconducting	Honeycomb	—N/a	1121	December 2023	
IBM	IBM Heron	Superconducting	—N/a	—N/a	133	December 2023	
IBM	IBM Heron R2	Superconducting	Heavy hex	96.5 (2 qubits)	156	November 2024	
IBM	IBM Nighthawk	Superconducting	Square		120	2026-01-05	
IBM	IBM Ourense	Superconducting	T	—N/a	5	July 3, 2019	
IBM	IBM Vigo	Superconducting	T	—N/a	5	July 3, 2019	
IBM	IBM London	Superconducting	T	—N/a	5	September 13, 2019	
IBM	IBM Burlington	Superconducting	T	—N/a	5	September 13, 2019	
IBM	IBM Essex	Superconducting	T	—N/a	5	September 13, 2019	
IBM	IBM Armonk	Superconducting	Single Qubit	—N/a	1	October 16, 2019	
IBM	IBM Athens	Superconducting		—N/a	5		32
IBM	IBM Belem	Superconducting	Falcon r4T	—N/a	5		16
IBM	IBM Bogotá	Superconducting	Falcon r4L	—N/a	5		32
IBM	IBM Casablanca	Superconducting	Falcon r4H	—N/a	7	(Retired – March 2022)	32
IBM	IBM Dublin	Superconducting		—N/a	27		64
IBM	IBM Guadalupe	Superconducting	Falcon r4P	—N/a	16		32
IBM	IBM Kolkata	Superconducting		—N/a	27		128
IBM	IBM Lima	Superconducting	Falcon r4T	—N/a	5		8
IBM	IBM Manhattan	Superconducting		—N/a	65		32
IBM	IBM Montreal	Superconducting	Falcon r4	—N/a	27		128
IBM	IBM Mumbai	Superconducting	Falcon r5.1	—N/a	27		128
IBM	IBM Paris	Superconducting		—N/a	27		32
IBM	IBM Quito	Superconducting	Falcon r4T	—N/a	5		16
IBM	IBM Rome	Superconducting		—N/a	5		32
IBM	IBM Santiago	Superconducting		—N/a	5		32
IBM	IBM Sydney	Superconducting	Falcon r4	—N/a	27		32
IBM	IBM Toronto	Superconducting	Falcon r4	—N/a	27		32
Intel	17-Qubit Superconducting Test Chip	Superconducting	40-pin cross gap	—N/a	17	October 10, 2017	
Intel	Tangle Lake	Superconducting	108-pin cross gap	—N/a	49	January 9, 2018	
Intel	Tunnel Falls	Semiconductor spin qubits			12	June 15, 2023	
IonQ	Harmony	Trapped ion	All-to-All	99.73 (1 qubit), 90.02 (2 qubit), 99.30 (SPAM)	11	2022	8
IonQ	Aria	Trapped ion	All-to-All	99.97 (1 qubit), 98.33 (2 qubit), 98.94 (SPAM)	25	2022	
IonQ	Forte	Trapped ion	366x1 chain All-to-All	99.98 (1 qubit), 98.5–99.3 (2 qubit), 99.56 (SPAM)	36 (earlier 32)	2022	
IQM	-	Superconducting	Star	99.91 (1 qubit); 99.14 (2 qubits)	5	November 30, 2021	—N/a
IQM	-	Superconducting	Square lattice	99.91 (1 qubit median), 99.944 (1 qubit max), 98.25 (2 qubits median), 99.1 (2 qubits max)	20	October 9, 2023	16
M Squared Lasers	Maxwell	Neutral atoms in optical lattices		99.5 (3-qubit gate), 99.1 (4-qubit gate)	200	November 2022	
Oxford Quantum Circuits	Lucy	Superconducting			8	2022	
Oxford Quantum Circuits	OQC Toshiko	Superconducting (Coaxmon)			32	2023	
Quandela	Ascella	Photonics	—N/a	99.6 (1 qubit); 93.8 (2 qubits); 86.0 (3 qubits)	6	2022	
QuTech at TU Delft	Spin-2	Semiconductor spin qubits		99 (average gate); 85 (readout)	2	2020	
QuTech at TU Delft	Starmon-5	Superconducting	X configuration	97 (readout)	5	2020	
QuTech at TU Delft	-	Semiconductor spin qubits			6	September 2022	
Quantinuum	H1-2	Trapped ion	All-to-All	99.996 (1 qubit); 99.7 (2 qubit)	12	2022	4096
Quantinuum	H1-1	Trapped ion	15×15 (Circuit Size)	99.996 (1 qubit); 99.914 (2 qubit)	20	2022	1,048,576
Quantinuum	H2	Trapped ion	Racetrack, All-to-All	99.997 (1 qubit); 99.87 (2 qubit)	56 (earlier 32)	June 5, 2024	8,388,608
Quantinuum	Helios	Trapped ion	Storage ring and legs	99.9975 (1 qubit), 99.921 (2 qubit)	98	November 2025	
Quantware	Soprano	Superconducting		99.9 (1 qubit gates)	5	July 2021	
Quantware	Contralto	Superconducting		99.9 (1-qubit gates)	25	March 7, 2022	
Quantware	Tenor	Superconducting			64	February 23, 2023	
Rigetti	Acorn	Superconducting transmon	—N/a	98.63 (1 qubit gates), 87.5 (2 qubit gates)	19	December 17, 2017	
Rigetti	Agave	Superconducting	—N/a	96 (1 qubit gates), 87 (2 qubit gates)	8	June 4, 2018	
Rigetti	Aspen-1	Superconducting	—N/a	93.23 (1 qubit gates), 90.84 (2 qubit gates)	16	November 30, 2018	
Rigetti	Aspen-4	Superconducting		99.88 (1 qubit gates), 94.42 (2 qubit gates)	13	March 10, 2019	
Rigetti	Aspen-7	Superconducting		99.23 (1 qubit gates), 95.2 (2 qubit gates)	28	November 15, 2019	
Rigetti	Aspen-8	Superconducting		99.22 (1 qubit gates), 94.34 (2 qubit gates)	31	May 5, 2020	
Rigetti	Aspen-9	Superconducting		99.39 (1 qubit gates), 94.28 (2 qubit gates)	32	February 6, 2021	
Rigetti	Aspen-10	Superconducting		99.37 (1 qubit gates), 94.66 (2 qubit gates)	32	November 4, 2021	
Rigetti	Aspen-11	Superconducting	Octagonal	99.8 (1 qubit gates), 92.7 (2 qubit gates CZ), 91.0 (2 qubit gates XY)	40	December 15, 2021	
Rigetti	Aspen-M-1	Superconducting transmon	Octagonal	99.8 (1 qubit gates), 93.7 (2 qubit gates CZ) 94.6 (2 qubit gates XY)	80	February 15, 2022	8
Rigetti	Aspen-M-2	Superconducting transmon		99.8 (1 qubit gates), 91.3 (2 qubit gates CZ), 90.0 (2 qubit gates XY)	80	August 1, 2022	
Rigetti	Aspen-M-3	Superconducting transmon	—N/a	99.9 (1 qubit gates), 94.7 (2 qubit gates CZ), 95.1 (2 qubit gates XY)	80	December 2, 2022	
Rigetti	Ankaa-2	Superconducting transmon	—N/a	98 (2 qubit gates)	84	December 20, 2023	
Rigetti	Ankaa-3	Superconducting transmon		99.91 (1 qubit gates), 98.6 (2 qubit gates)	82	December 23, 2024	
Rigetti	Cepheus-1-108Q	Superconducting transmon		99.54 (1 qubit gates), 98.97 (2 qubit gates CZ)	108	April 7, 2026	
RIKEN	RIKEN	Superconducting	—N/a	—N/a	53 effective (64 total)	March 27, 2023	—N/a
SaxonQ	Princess	Nitrogen-vacancy center			4	June 26, 2024	
SaxonQ	Princess+	Nitrogen-vacancy center			4	June 12, 2025	
SpinQ	Triangulum	Nuclear magnetic resonance			3	September 2021	
USTC	Jiuzhang	Photonics	—N/a	—N/a	76	2020	
USTC	Zuchongzhi	Superconducting	—N/a	—N/a	62	2020	
USTC	Zuchongzhi 2.1	Superconducting	lattice	99.86 (1 qubit gates), 99.41 (2 qubit gates), 95.48 (Readout)	66	2021	
USTC	Zuchongzhi 3.0	Superconducting transmon	15 x 7	99.90 (1 qubit gates), 99.62 (2 qubit gates), 99.18 (Readout)	105	December 16, 2024	
Xanadu	X8	Photonics (Continuous-variable)	—N/a	—N/a	8	2020	
Xanadu	X12	Photonics (Continuous-variable)	—N/a	—N/a	12	2020	
Xanadu	X24	Photonics (Continuous-variable)	—N/a	—N/a	24	2020	
Xanadu	Borealis	Photonics (Continuous-variable)	—N/a	—N/a	216	2022	

== Annealing quantum processors ==
These QPUs are based on quantum annealing, not to be confused with digital annealing.

Manufacturer	Name/Codename /Designation	Architecture	Layout	Fidelity (%)	Qubits	Release date
D-Wave	D-Wave One (Rainier)	Superconducting	C_{4} = Chimera(4,4,4) = 4×4 K_{4,4}	—N/a	128	May 11, 2011
D-Wave	D-Wave Two	Superconducting	C_{8} = Chimera(8,8,4) = 8×8 K_{4,4}	—N/a	512	2013
D-Wave	D-Wave 2X	Superconducting	C_{12} = Chimera(12,12,4) = 12×12 K_{4,4}	—N/a	1152	2015
D-Wave	D-Wave 2000Q	Superconducting	C_{16} = Chimera(16,16,4) = 16×16 K_{4,4}	—N/a	2000	2017
D-Wave	D-Wave Advantage	Superconducting	Pegasus P_{16}	—N/a	5000	2020
D-Wave	D-Wave Advantage 2	Superconducting	Zephyr Z_{15}	—N/a	4400	2025

== Analog quantum processors ==
These QPUs are based on analog Hamiltonian simulation.

Manufacturer	Name/Codename/Designation	Architecture	Layout	Fidelity (%)	Qubits	Release date
QuEra	Aquila	Neutral atoms	—N/a	—N/a	256	November 2022

== See also ==
- Quantum programming
- Timeline of quantum computing and communication
