= Processor (computing) =

Electrical component for processing data

In computing and computer science, a processor or processing unit is an electrical component (digital circuit) that performs operations on an external data source, usually memory or some other data stream. The term is frequently used to refer to the central processing unit (CPU), the main processor in a system. It can also refer to other specialized processors such as graphics processing units (GPU), quantum processing units (QPU), and digital signal processors (DSP). The design and development of a processor is intricate and time-consuming because it requires defining both its functional requirements (operations it must perform) and its non-functional requirements (the physical and performance constraints). It is typically built to operate on digital data, as an integrated circuit using semiconducting material, containing transistors organized into logic gates, further organized into sections such as IP blocks or cores, that can be connected together.

== History ==
The word "processor" has been applied to computers since at least the early 1950s. Early computers utilized complex arrays of vacuum tubes. These early computers were large, expensive, and power-intensive, limiting their use to large organizations. The Manchester Mark 1 represents one of the earliest processors in the modern sense, as the first general-purpose computer capable of storing programs.

The invention of the transistor brought about rapid innovation in the computer industry. Transistors enabled computer processors to be denser and more power efficient, reducing the size of computers from rooms to something that could fit on a desk. Processors began to increase in processing power by a factor of two every year as transistors shrunk in size and more could be incorporated in a single computer, an observation known as Moore's law. The first transistors used in computing were millimeters across, now modern transistors can be produced at less than 5nm.

Transistors eventually shrunk to the point where an entire processor could be implemented on a few monolithic integrated circuits (chips); those processors were called microprocessors. The first generally-available single-chip microprocessor was the Intel 4004, which combined all of the logic circuits required by a computer into a single integrated circuit chip. It brought computing power to consumer devices such as digital calculators and pinball machines. The Intel 8008 was the first single-chip microprocessor used as a general-purpose processor. Modern processors have followed that format, utilizing discretely packaged single-chip microprocessors with external memory and I/O.

== Design ==
When designing a processor, the non-functional and functional requirements must be established before the design can be applied to hardware or software systems. Many functional requirements are selected from a set of basic instructions or common algorithms used within processing chips. Although a variety of tools are employed to aid processor development, the overall design process remains time-consuming because of the numerous intricacies involved.

The non-functional requirements of a processor refer to its materialistic components. For example, the processor’s silicon area, pin count, and power and energy consumption all affect the design. The cost of manufacturing the processor and its retail price affect those components.

Diagram of a processor with connected memory using von Neumann architecture

The functional requirements of a processor are its operations and operating environment. The operations are the set of instructions that the processor follows in order to execute its main function. Operations are written using different sets of algorithms, with varying operands. The time a processor spends running, the type of memory subsystem connected to the processor, and the input/output (I/O) are all examples of operating environments. These environments impact how the operations within the functional requirements are written.

Profiling algorithms helps determine critical details within an algorithm that affect its optimality. Profiling between the prototype code and existing processor designs develops understanding of algorithmic applications. Algorithms within existing processors are usually built to optimize slightly different main functions, so not all operations used in this reference may be needed in the prototype design. If the developer relies solely on the reference, the final operating code may be inefficient.

The organizational architecture of a processor refers to the ordered set of basic instructions that allows the processor to complete its task. There are numerous ways the instructions can be organized in order to achieve a certain goal, but the efficiency of the code will vary. Using kernel operations, automated performance estimators, or simulator generators can help the developer determine the most efficient organizational architecture for the processor.

When the final prototype of the processor is created, it is implemented into different hardwares and softwares. Hardware implementation requires high-level modeling such as converting functional blocks into a hardware description language and arranging the functional blocks on the processor chip to optimize its performance and area. Software implementation is the hardest part of the design process. This process requires debugging hardware and software issues that prevent the processor to run cohesively within the software.

== Types ==
=== CPU ===
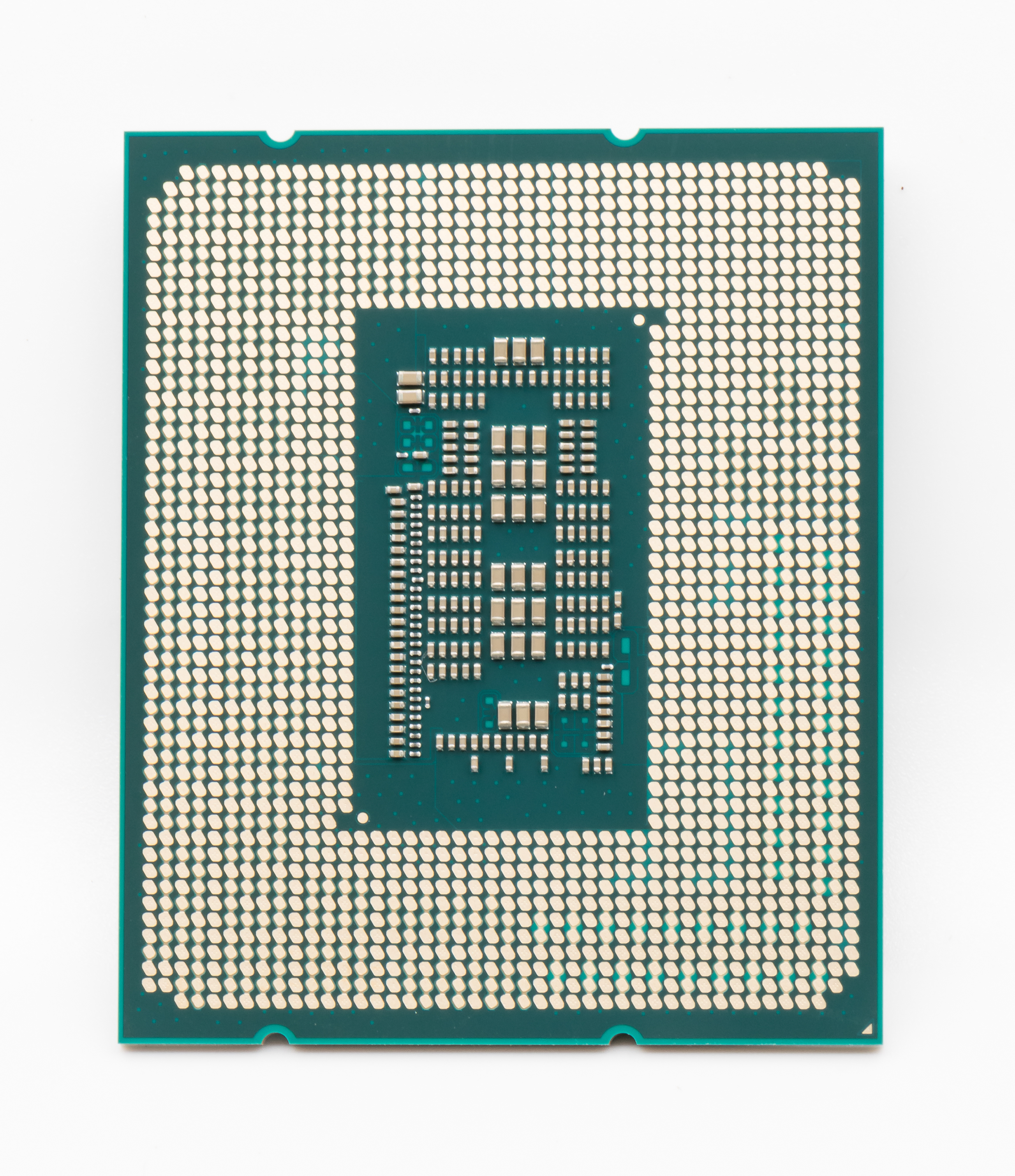
CPU made by Intel (2023)

Central processing units (CPUs) are the primary processors in computers and are responsible for executing program instructions. They perform general-purpose computing tasks using two main components: the arithmetic logic unit (ALU), which performs all math and logical comparisons, and the control unit (CU), which manages the CPU's activities. Most CPUs follow the von Neumann architecture, where instructions and data share a common memory space. The architecture executes programs through a cycle in which the CPU first fetches the instruction from memory and the CU decodes it, then the instruction is executed, and the ALU finally stores the result back into memory. CPUs work closely with the main memory, storage devices, and peripheral hardwares through the motherboard. Together, these components allow the CPUs to execute instructions that run the computer, making them essential in fields like consumer electronics, automotive, data analytics, and virtualization.

=== GPU ===
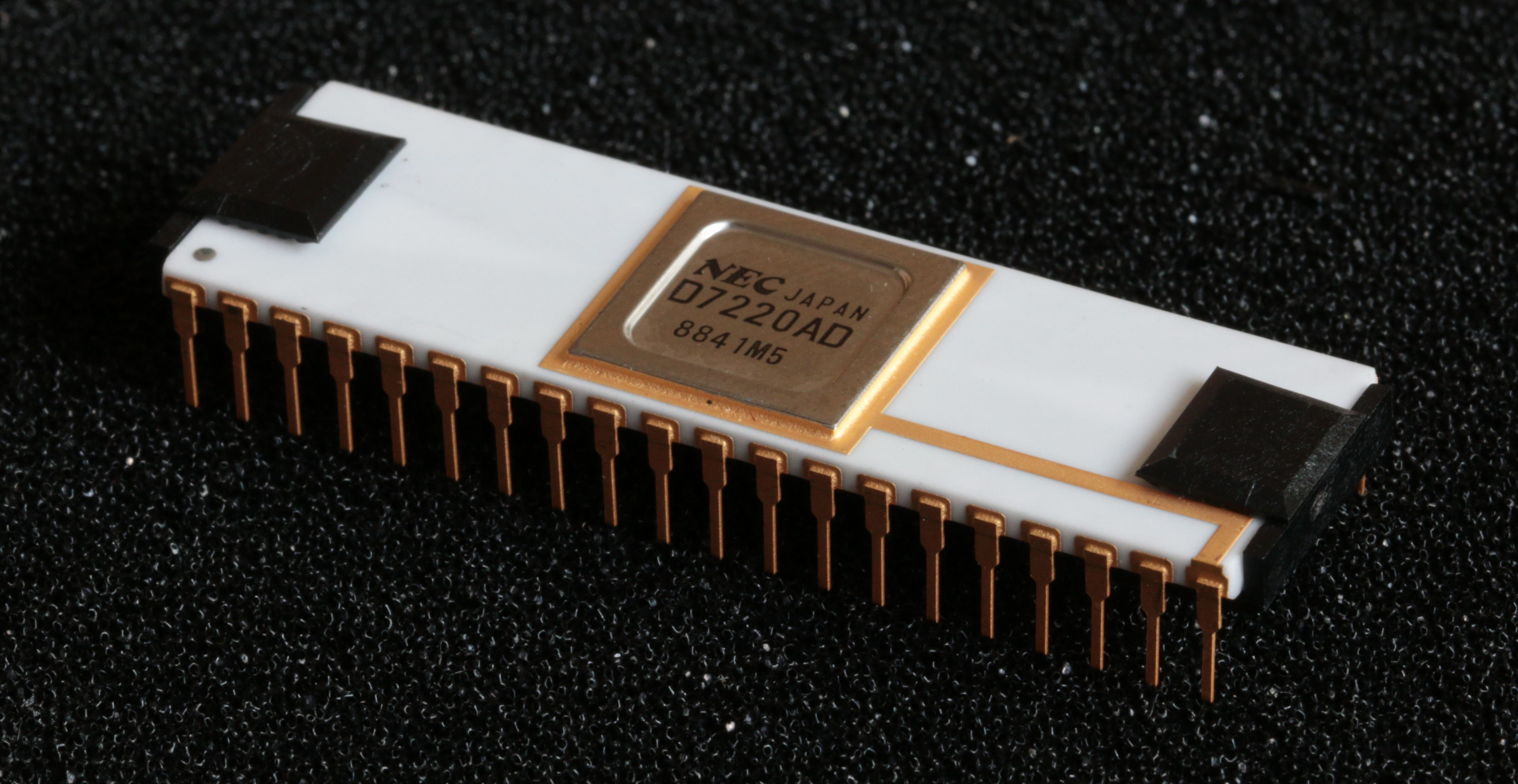
NEC μPD7220 – A GPU made NEC 1981

Graphics processing units (GPUs) are components present in several devices such as laptops, PCs, smartphones, game consoles, supercomputers, robots, point-of-sale (POS) machines, HPCs, visualization, or high-end games. They are highly parallel, designed to efficiently perform computer graphics operations, and are useful for gaming, machine learning, video editing, and artificial intelligence. Although GPUs were originally intended for use in graphics, over time their application domains have expanded, and now incorporate a multitude of tasks including being an important piece of hardware for machine learning.

=== DSP ===
Digital signal processors (DSPs) are processors in computers and are responsible for processing digital signals, including audio, video, and sensor measurements. DSPs are engineered for predictable, real-time performance using two key features: deterministic instruction time, which guarantees reliable execution speed, and a memory layout that supports simultaneous access to both instructions and data. Because DSPs are programmable, they are fit for a wide range of applications, including audio signal processing, speech recognition, telecommunications, sonar, radar, spectral density estimation, statistical signal processing, digital image processing, data compression, video coding, audio coding, image compression, biomedical engineering, and seismology. The application of digital computation to signal processing allows for many advantages over analog processing.

=== QPU ===
The quantum processing unit (QPU) is the core component of a quantum computer. The QPU processes information using qubits which make up the quantum chip and are integrated into high-performance computing (HPC) systems alongside CPUs and GPUs. The most common types of quantum processors are superconducting processors, photonic processors, neutral atom quantum processors, trapped ion processors, topological processors, and quantum dot processors, each having variations in its architecture, layout, fidelity, and number of qubits. These variations are suited for certain tasks such as speed, coherence times, scalability, compatibility, and performance. Manufacturers of QPUs include IBM, D-Wave, Google, and Rigetti.

=== DPU ===
A data processing unit (DPU) is a programmable computer processor that tightly integrates a general-purpose CPU with network interface hardware.

=== NPU ===
A neural processing unit (NPU), also known as an AI accelerator or deep learning processor, is a class of specialized hardware accelerator or computer system designed to accelerate artificial intelligence and machine learning applications, including artificial neural networks and computer vision.
