= Quantum supremacy =

Computational benchmark

In quantum computing, quantum supremacy or quantum advantage is the goal of demonstrating that a programmable quantum computer can solve a problem that no classical computer can solve in any feasible amount of time, irrespective of the usefulness of the problem. The term was coined by John Preskill in 2011, but the concept dates to Yuri Manin's 1980 and Richard Feynman's 1981 proposals of quantum computing.

Conceptually, quantum supremacy involves both the engineering task of building a powerful quantum computer and the computational-complexity-theoretic task of finding a problem that can be solved by that quantum computer and has a superpolynomial speedup over the best known or possible classical algorithm for that task.

A notable property of quantum supremacy is that it can be feasibly achieved by near-term quantum computers, since it does not require a quantum computer to perform any useful task or use high-quality quantum error correction, both of which are long-term goals. Consequently, researchers view quantum supremacy as primarily a scientific goal, with relatively little immediate bearing on the future commercial viability of quantum computing. Due to unpredictable possible improvements in classical computers and algorithms, quantum supremacy may be temporary or unstable, placing possible achievements under significant scrutiny.

Examples of proposals to demonstrate quantum supremacy include the boson sampling proposal of Aaronson and Arkhipov, and sampling the output of random quantum circuits. The output distributions that are obtained by making measurements in boson sampling or quantum random circuit sampling are flat, but structured in a way so that one cannot classically efficiently sample from a distribution that is close to the distribution generated by the quantum experiment. For this conclusion to be valid, only very mild assumptions in the theory of computational complexity have to be invoked. In this sense, quantum random sampling schemes can have the potential to show quantum supremacy.

== Background ==
=== Quantum supremacy in the 20th century ===
In 1936, Alan Turing published his paper, "On Computable Numbers", in response to the 1900 Hilbert Problems. Turing's paper described what he called a "universal computing machine", which later became known as a Turing machine. In 1980, Paul Benioff used Turing's paper to propose the theoretical feasibility of Quantum Computing. His paper, "The Computer as a Physical System: A Microscopic Quantum Mechanical Hamiltonian Model of Computers as Represented by Turing Machines", was the first to demonstrate that it is possible to show the reversible nature of quantum computing as long as the energy dissipated is arbitrarily small. In 1981, Richard Feynman showed that quantum mechanics could not be efficiently simulated on classical devices. During a lecture, he delivered the famous quote, "Nature isn't classical, dammit, and if you want to make a simulation of nature, you'd better make it quantum mechanical, and by golly it's a wonderful problem, because it doesn't look so easy." Soon after this, David Deutsch produced a description for a quantum Turing machine and designed an algorithm created to run on a quantum computer.

In 1994, further progress toward quantum supremacy was made when Peter Shor formulated Shor's algorithm, streamlining a method for factoring integers in polynomial time. In 1995, Christopher Monroe and David Wineland published their paper, "Demonstration of a Fundamental Quantum Logic Gate", marking the first demonstration of a quantum logic gate, specifically the two-bit "controlled-NOT". In 1996, Lov Grover put into motion an interest in fabricating a quantum computer after publishing his algorithm, Grover's Algorithm, in his paper, "A fast quantum mechanical algorithm for database search". In 1998, Jonathan A. Jones and Michele Mosca published "Implementation of a Quantum Algorithm to Solve Deutsch's Problem on a Nuclear Magnetic Resonance Quantum Computer", marking the first demonstration of a quantum algorithm.

=== Progress in the 21st century ===
Vast progress toward quantum supremacy was made in the 2000s from the first 5-qubit nuclear magnetic resonance computer (2000), the demonstration of Shor's theorem (2001), and the implementation of Deutsch's algorithm in a clustered quantum computer (2007). In 2011, D-Wave Systems of Burnaby, British Columbia, Canada became the first company to sell a quantum computer commercially. In 2012, physicist Nanyang Xu landed a milestone accomplishment by using an improved adiabatic factoring algorithm to factor 143. However, the methods used by Xu were met with objections. Not long after this accomplishment, Google purchased its first quantum computer.

Google had announced plans to demonstrate quantum supremacy before the end of 2017 with an array of 49 superconducting qubits. In early January 2018, Intel announced a similar hardware program. In October 2017, IBM demonstrated the simulation of 56 qubits on a classical supercomputer, thereby increasing the computational power needed to establish quantum supremacy. In November 2018, Google announced a partnership with NASA that would "analyze results from quantum circuits run on Google quantum processors, and ... provide comparisons with classical simulation to both support Google in validating its hardware and establish a baseline for quantum supremacy." Theoretical work published in 2018 suggested that quantum supremacy should be possible with a "two-dimensional lattice of 7×7 qubits and around 40 clock cycles" if error rates can be pushed low enough. The scheme discussed was a variant of a quantum random sampling scheme in which qubits undergo random quantum circuits featuring quantum gates drawn from a universal gate set, followed by measurements in the computational basis.

On June 18, 2019, Quanta Magazine suggested that quantum supremacy could happen in 2019, according to Neven's law. On September 20, 2019, the Financial Times reported that "Google claims to have reached quantum supremacy with an array of 54 qubits out of which 53 were functional, which were used to perform a series of operations in 200 seconds that would take a supercomputer about 10,000 years to complete".

This announcement was met with a rebuttal from Google's direct competitor, IBM. IBM contended that the calculation Google claimed would take 10,000 years could be performed in just 2.5 days on its own Summit supercomputer if its architecture were optimized, sparking a debate over the precise threshold for "quantum supremacy"

However, separate from this debate, the demonstration that Google's Sycamore processor could perform a specific calculation significantly faster than the most powerful existing supercomputer is considered a major scientific achievement. The research was published in the peer-reviewed scientific journal Nature. In 2024, the Google team estimated that, thanks to improvements in classical tensor network algorithms, simulating 53 qubits would take only six seconds on the Frontier supercomputer.

In December 2020, a group based in the University of Science and Technology of China (USTC) led by Pan Jianwei reached quantum supremacy by implementing gaussian boson sampling on 76 photons with their photonic quantum computer Jiuzhang. The paper states that to generate the number of samples the quantum computer generates in 200 seconds, a classical supercomputer would require 2.5 billion years of computation.

In October 2021, teams from USTC again reported quantum primacy by building two supercomputers called Jiuzhang 2.0 and Zuchongzhi. The light-based Jiuzhang 2.0 implemented gaussian boson sampling to detect 113 photons from a 144-mode optical interferometer and a sampling rate speed up of 10^{24} – a difference of 37 photons and 10 orders of magnitude over the previous Jiuzhang. Zuchongzhi is a programmable superconducting quantum computer that needs to be kept at extremely low temperatures to work efficiently and uses random circuit sampling to obtain 56 qubits from a tunable coupling architecture of 66 transmons—an improvement over Google's Sycamore 2019 achievement by 3 qubits, meaning a greater computational cost of classical simulation of 2 to 3 orders of magnitude. A third study reported that Zuchongzhi 2.1 completed a sampling task that "is about 6 orders of magnitude more difficult than that of Sycamore" "in the classic simulation".

In June 2022, Xanadu reported a boson sampling experiment summing to those of Google and USTC. Their setup used loops of optical fiber and multiplexing to replace the network of beam splitters by a single one which made it also more easily reconfigurable. They detected a mean of 125 up to 219 photons from 216 squeezed modes (squeezed light follows a photon number distribution so they can contain more than one photon per mode) and claim to have obtained a speedup 50 million times more than previous experiments.

In March of 2024, D-Wave Systems reported on an experiment using a quantum annealing based processor that out-performed classical methods including tensor networks and neural networks. They argued that no known classical approach could yield the same results as the quantum simulation within a reasonable time-frame and claimed quantum supremacy. The task performed was the simulation of the non-equilibrium dynamics of a magnetic spin system quenched through a quantum phase transition. A later tensor network-based study, however, questioned this advantage, demonstrating that a number of the D-Wave supremacy experiments can be simulated with comparable or superior accuracy on classical hardware using efficient, optimized tensor network techniques.

=== Achievements in quantum error correction ===
Google is also considered a leader in the field of quantum error correction, one of the biggest challenges in quantum computing. In research also published in Nature, the company was the first to demonstrate that it was possible to build a logical qubit with a lower error rate than the physical qubits that constitute it.

This is seen as a crucial step toward fault-tolerant quantum computers, which are necessary for practical applications. Whereas the "quantum supremacy" experiment demonstrated the potential 'speed' of quantum computers, this research demonstrated their potential for 'stability' and 'reliability'.

Furthermore, Google contributes to the open-source research ecosystem by providing software frameworks such as Cirq and TensorFlow Quantum, which allow researchers to develop and test new quantum algorithms.

== Computational complexity ==
Complexity arguments concern how the amount of some resource needed to solve a problem (generally time or memory) scales with the size of the input. In this setting, a problem consists of an inputted problem instance (a binary string) and returned solution (corresponding output string), while resources refers to designated elementary operations, memory usage, or communication. A collection of local operations allows for the computer to generate the output string. A circuit model and its corresponding operations are useful in describing both classical and quantum problems; the classical circuit model consists of basic operations such as AND gates, OR gates, and NOT gates while the quantum model consists of classical circuits and the application of unitary operations. Unlike the finite set of classical gates, there are an infinite amount of quantum gates due to the continuous nature of unitary operations. In both classical and quantum cases, complexity swells with increasing problem size. As an extension of classical computational complexity theory, quantum complexity theory considers what a theoretical universal quantum computer could accomplish without accounting for the difficulty of building a physical quantum computer or dealing with decoherence and noise. Since quantum information is a generalization of classical information, quantum computers can simulate any classical algorithm.

Quantum complexity classes are sets of problems that share a common quantum computational model, with each model containing specified resource constraints. Circuit models are useful in describing quantum complexity classes. The most useful quantum complexity class is BQP (bounded-error quantum polynomial time), the class of decision problems that can be solved in polynomial time by a universal quantum computer. Questions about BQP still remain, such as the connection between BQP and the polynomial-time hierarchy, whether or not BQP contains NP-complete problems, and the exact lower and upper bounds of the BQP class. Not only would answers to these questions reveal the nature of BQP, but they would also answer difficult classical complexity theory questions. One strategy for better understanding BQP is by defining related classes, ordering them into a conventional class hierarchy, and then looking for properties that are revealed by their relation to BQP. There are several other quantum complexity classes, such as QMA (quantum Merlin Arthur) and QIP (quantum interactive polynomial time).

The difficulty of proving what cannot be done with classical computing is a common problem in definitively demonstrating quantum supremacy. Contrary to decision problems that require yes or no answers, sampling problems ask for samples from probability distributions. If there is a classical algorithm that can efficiently sample from the output of an arbitrary quantum circuit, the polynomial hierarchy would collapse to the third level, which is generally considered to be very unlikely. Boson sampling is a more specific proposal, the classical hardness of which depends upon the intractability of calculating the permanent of a large matrix with complex entries, which is a #P-complete problem. The arguments used to reach this conclusion have been extended to IQP Sampling, where only the conjecture that the average- and worst-case complexities of the problem are the same is needed, as well as to Random Circuit Sampling, which is the task replicated by the Google and USTC research groups.

== Experimental motivations ==
Beyond theoretical interest in classically hard regimes, there are independent experimental motivations. Such experiments can serve as system-level tests of control, calibration, and error characterization on programmable quantum processors.

Sampling-based benchmarks can be used to calibrate and validate processors as integrated systems; random circuit sampling has been described as "a sensitive computational benchmark that fails if just a single component of the computer is not good enough."

== Proposed experiments ==
The following are proposals for demonstrating quantum computational supremacy using current technology, often called NISQ devices. Such proposals include (1) a well-defined computational problem, (2) a quantum algorithm to solve this problem, (3) a comparison best-case classical algorithm to solve the problem, and (4) a complexity-theoretic argument that, under a reasonable assumption, no classical algorithm can perform significantly better than current algorithms (so the quantum algorithm still provides a superpolynomial speedup).

=== Shor's algorithm for factoring integers ===
This algorithm finds the prime factorization of an n-bit integer in $\tilde{O} (n^3)$ time whereas the best known classical algorithm requires $2^{O(n^{1/3})}$time and the best upper bound for the complexity of this problem is $O(2^{n/3+o(1)})$. It can also provide a speedup for any problem that reduces to integer factoring, including the membership problem for matrix groups over fields of odd order.

This algorithm is important both practically and historically for quantum computing. It was the first polynomial-time quantum algorithm proposed for a real-world problem that is believed to be hard for classical computers. Namely, it gives a superpolynomial speedup under the reasonable assumption that RSA, a well-established cryptosystem, is secure.

Factoring has some benefit over other supremacy proposals because factoring can be checked quickly with a classical computer just by multiplying integers, even for large instances where factoring algorithms are intractably slow. However, implementing Shor's algorithm for large numbers is infeasible with current technology, so it is not being pursued as a strategy for demonstrating supremacy.

=== Boson sampling ===
This computing paradigm based upon sending identical photons through a linear-optical network can solve certain sampling and search problems that, assuming a few complexity-theoretical conjectures (that calculating the permanent of Gaussian matrices is #P-Hard and that the polynomial hierarchy does not collapse) are intractable for classical computers. However, it has been shown that boson sampling in a system with large enough loss and noise can be simulated efficiently.

The largest experimental implementation of boson sampling to date had 6 modes so could handle up to 6 photons at a time. The best proposed classical algorithm for simulating boson sampling runs in time $O(n2^n+mn^2)$ for a system with n photons and m output modes. The algorithm leads to an estimate of 50 photons required to demonstrate quantum supremacy with boson sampling.

=== Sampling the output distribution of random quantum circuits ===
The best known algorithm for simulating an arbitrary random quantum circuit requires an amount of time that scales exponentially with the number of qubits, leading one group to estimate that around 50 qubits could be enough to demonstrate quantum supremacy. Bouland, Fefferman, Nirkhe and Vazirani gave, in 2018, theoretical evidence that efficiently simulating a random quantum circuit would require a collapse of the computational polynomial hierarchy. Google had announced its intention to demonstrate quantum supremacy by the end of 2017 by constructing and running a 49-qubit chip that would be able to sample distributions inaccessible to any current classical computers in a reasonable amount of time. The largest universal quantum circuit simulator running on classical supercomputers at the time was able to simulate 48 qubits. But for particular kinds of circuits, larger quantum circuit simulations with 56 qubits are possible. This may require increasing the number of qubits to demonstrate quantum supremacy. On October 23, 2019, Google published the results of this quantum supremacy experiment in the Nature article, "Quantum Supremacy Using a Programmable Superconducting Processor" in which they developed a new 53-qubit processor, named "Sycamore", that is capable of fast, high-fidelity quantum logic gates, in order to perform the benchmark testing. Google claims that their machine performed the target computation in 200 seconds, and estimated that their classical algorithm would take 10,000 years in the world's fastest supercomputer to solve the same problem. IBM disputed this claim, saying that an improved classical algorithm should be able to solve that problem in two and a half days on that same supercomputer.

== Criticisms ==
=== Susceptibility to error ===
Quantum computers are much more susceptible to errors than classical computers due to decoherence and noise. The threshold theorem states that a noisy quantum computer can use quantum error-correcting codes to simulate a noiseless quantum computer, assuming the error introduced in each computer cycle is less than some number. Numerical simulations suggest that that number may be as high as 3%. However, it is not yet definitively known how the resources needed for error correction will scale with the number of qubits. Skeptics point to the unknown behavior of noise in scaled-up quantum systems as a potential roadblock for successfully implementing quantum computing and demonstrating quantum supremacy.

=== Criticism of the name ===
Some researchers have suggested that the term "quantum supremacy" should not be used, arguing that the word "supremacy" evokes distasteful comparisons to the racist belief of white supremacy. A controversial commentary article in the journal Nature signed by thirteen researchers asserts that the alternative phrase "quantum advantage" should be used instead. John Preskill, the professor of theoretical physics at the California Institute of Technology who coined the term, has since clarified that the term was proposed to explicitly describe the moment that a quantum computer gains the ability to perform a task that a classical computer never could. He further explained that he specifically rejected the term "quantum advantage" as it did not fully encapsulate the meaning of his new term: the word "advantage" would imply that a computer with quantum supremacy would have a slight edge over a classical computer while the word "supremacy" better conveys complete ascendancy over any classical computer. Nature's Philip Ball wrote in December 2020 that the term "quantum advantage" has "largely replaced" the term "quantum supremacy".

== See also ==
- Gottesman–Knill theorem
- List of quantum processors
  - Sycamore processor
  - Jiuzhang (quantum computer)
- Noisy intermediate-scale quantum era
