= IBM Condor =

1,121-qubit quantum processor by IBM

- Developer: IBM Research
- Manufacturer: IBM
- Type: Quantum processor
- Released: December 4, 2023; 2 years ago
- System on a chip: Cross-resonance
- Predecessor: IBM Osprey
- Successor: IBM Flamingo and IBM Crossbill (based on IBM's quantum roadmap to 2033)
- Website: www.ibm.com/quantum/blog/quantum-roadmap-2033

IBM Condor is a 1,121-qubit quantum processor created by IBM, unveiled during the IBM Quantum Summit 2023, which occurred on December 4, 2023. It is the 2nd largest quantum processor (in terms of qubits), just shy of the 1,125-qubit quantum processor by the company Atom, created in October 2023.

It has a similar performance to its predecessor, the IBM Osprey.

It has a 50% increase in qubit density compared to the IBM Osprey, and over a mile of high-density cryogenic flex IO wiring.

It is not as fast as the IBM Heron, unveiled during the same event.
