= Atom Computing =

Quantum Computing company

Atom Computing Inc.
- Company type: Private company
- Industry: Quantum Computing
- Founded: 2018; 7 years ago
- Founders: Ben Bloom; Jonathan King
- Headquarters: Berkeley, California, United States
- Key people: Ben Bloom, CEO
- Website: www.atom-computing.com

Atom Computing Inc. is a quantum computing company headquartered in Berkeley, California with a commercial operations facility in Boulder, Colorado. The company develops quantum computers based on neutral atom technology.

== History ==
Atom Computing was founded by Ben Bloom and Jonathan King in 2018 with $5M in seed funding.

Rob Hayes served as CEO in 2021.

In 2021 the company secured $15M in Series A funding and announced a 100-qubit prototype system.

By early 2022 the company secured $60M in Series B funding and expanded its activities by opening a commercial operations facility in Boulder, Colorado.

In 2023 Atom Computing announced its second-generation quantum computer with over 1,000 qubits.

Microsoft and Atom Computing announced in late 2024 that they had been collaborating on a commercial quantum computer that has logical qubits by combining Microsoft's work on quantum error correction with Atom's over-1,000-qubit system.

== Technology ==
Atom Computing's technology is based on neutral atoms, specifically alkaline earth(-like) metals such as strontium and ytterbium. By manipulating the atoms in a vacuum chamber with laser beams, quantum information can be written into the nuclear spin of the atoms to perform gate operations and execute quantum circuits.

Along with several academic groups, Atom Computing has demonstrated how to use this technology to perform mid-circuit measurements on ancilla qubits, create arrays of over 1,000 qubits, and perform entangling gates.

In November 2024, Atom Computing, together with researchers from Microsoft, demonstrated the entanglement of 24 logical qubits and running a Bernstein–Vazirani algorithm with 28 logical qubits on Atom Computing's hardware.

== Recognition ==
In 2024 the Colorado Technology Association recognized Atom Computing as the "Emerging Tech Company of the Year" and Fast Company recognized the company as one of "The 10 most innovative computing companies in 2025".

Atom Computing was selected by the Defense Advanced Research Projects Agency (DARPA) to participate in Stage B of the Quantum Benchmarking Initiative (QBI), joining ten other leading companies in the quantum computing industry. This selection follows Atom Computing’s successful completion of Stage A, which required participants to outline a path to developing utility-scale quantum computers. The QBI program seeks to assess whether a practical, industrially useful quantum computer can be realized by 2033.

== See also ==
- D-Wave Systems
- IonQ
- Rigetti Computing
- Quantinuum
- Xanadu Quantum Technologies
