= IBM Heron =

156-qubit quantum processor by IBM

- Developer: IBM Research
- Manufacturer: IBM
- Type: Quantum processor
- Released: December 4, 2023; 2 years ago
- System on a chip: Tunable coupler
- Predecessor: IBM Egret or IBM Osprey
- Website: research.ibm.com/blog/quantum-roadmap-2033

IBM Heron is a 156-qubit tunable-coupler quantum processor created by IBM, originally unveiled during the IBM Quantum Summit 2023, which occurred on December 4, 2023, and is the highest performance quantum processor IBM has ever built.

It is currently in use on the IBM Quantum System Two, unveiled during the same event.

IBM claims that this processor eliminates cross-talk errors that emerged in their previous quantum processors, and that this processor is being made available for users via the cloud.

The first version is reportedly 5 times faster than their previous best record set by the IBM Eagle.

== IBM Heron r2 ==
During the IBM Quantum Developer Conference, a second revision (called r2) was released, which increased the qubit count from 133 to 156, and introduced a two-level system mitigation to reduce the impact of an important source of noise.

== IBM Heron r3 ==
The instruction set of Heron r3 consist of seven instructions: Controlled-Z, ZZ interaction, Id (a NOP), the rotation operators Rx, Rz, and square root of NOT, as well as NOT. It can perform about 300 to 350 thousand of these instructions per second (CLOPS_{h}), and with bitflip (T1) and phaseflip (T2) decoherence time about 200 microseconds. That clockspeed and decoherence time means the Heron r3 computers can execute about 50 instructions until decoherence occurs on average.

== See also ==
- Noisy intermediate-scale quantum computing
- Superconducting quantum computing
- Transmon
