= IBM Osprey =

2022 433-qubit quantum processor by IBM

- Developer: IBM Research
- Manufacturer: IBM
- Type: Quantum processor
- Released: November 9, 2022; 3 years ago (announced, not fully released)
- Predecessor: IBM Eagle
- Successor: IBM Condor or IBM Heron
- Website: newsroom.ibm.com/2022-11-09-IBM-Unveils-400-Qubit-Plus-Quantum-Processor-and-Next-Generation-IBM-Quantum-System-Two

IBM Osprey is a 433-qubit quantum processor created by IBM, revealed during the IBM Quantum Summit 2022, which occurred on November 9, 2022, in New York, United States.

It is 3 times larger than its predecessor, the IBM Eagle.

It needs to be cooled down to a temperature of ~0.02 K (-273.13 °C).
