= IBM Eagle =

2021 quantum processor by IBM

IBM Eagle is a 127-qubit quantum processor. IBM claims that it can not be simulated by any classical computer. It is two times bigger than China's Jiuzhang 2. It was revealed on November 16, 2021, and was claimed to be the most powerful quantum processor ever made until November 2022, when the IBM Osprey overtook it with 433 qubits. It is almost twice as powerful as their last processor, the 'Hummingbird', which had 65 quantum bits and was created in 2020. IBM believes that the processes used in creating the 'Eagle', will be the backbone for their future processors.
