= Jiuzhang (quantum computer) =

Quantum computer prototype

Jiuzhang (Chinese: 九章) is the first photonic quantum computer to claim quantum supremacy. Previously quantum supremacy has been achieved only once, in 2019, by Google's Sycamore; however, Google's computer was based on superconducting materials, and not photons. Describing the difference between Jiuzhang and Google's Sycamore, Scientific American explained, "Sycamore uses superconducting loops of metal to form qubits; in Jiŭzhāng, the photons themselves are the qubits."

Jiuzhang was developed by a team from University of Science and Technology of China (USTC) led by Pan Jianwei and Lu Chao-Yang. The computer is named after Jiuzhang suanshu, an ancient Chinese mathematical classic book.

On 3 December 2020, USTC announced in Science that Jiuzhang successfully performed Gaussian boson sampling in 200 seconds (3 minutes 20 seconds), with a maximum of 76 detected photons. The USTC group estimated that it would take 2.5 billion years for the Sunway TaihuLight supercomputer to perform the same calculation.

Since 2020, the system has received several upgrades, with improved performance. In 2026, according to the South China Morning Post, USTC scientists reported that their current version Jiuzhang 4.0 "completed a Gaussian boson sampling task in just 25 microseconds – a calculation they estimated would take the world’s most powerful supercomputer, El Capitan in the United States, more than 10^42 years to finish."

== Experimental setup ==
The setup involves a Verdi-pumped Mira 900 Ti:sapphire laser which is split into 13 paths of equal intensity and then shone on 25 PPKTP crystals to produce 25 two-mode squeezed states. Through a hybrid encoding this is equivalent to 50 single-mode squeezed states. The purity is increased from 98% to 99% by 12 nm filtering. The 50 single-mode squeezed states are sent into a 100-mode interferometer and sampled by 100 single-photon detectors with an efficiency of 81%.
