= List of quantum software =

List of software for quantum computing

This is a list of quantum software, including software development kits, programming languages, instruction set architectures, intermediate representations, simulators, and cloud platforms used in quantum computing. Quantum software is used to design quantum algorithms, create and manipulate quantum circuits, compile programs for quantum processors, simulate quantum systems on classical computers, and run experiments on cloud-accessible quantum hardware.

== Programming languages and instruction sets ==
Software or language	Description
Blackbird	Quantum instruction set and intermediate representation used for continuous-variable photonic quantum programs.
cQASM	Hardware-agnostic quantum assembly language intended to support interoperability between quantum compilation and simulation tools.
OpenQASM	Quantum assembly language and intermediate representation designed for describing quantum circuits and quantum algorithms for execution on quantum computers.
Q#	Domain-specific language developed by Microsoft for expressing quantum algorithms.
Quantum Computation Language	Early quantum programming language with an interpreter and a built-in simulated quantum computer.
Quantum Intermediate Representation	Intermediate representation based on the LLVM compiler infrastructure for representing quantum programs.
QMASM	Low-level language for quantum annealers, including systems based on the Ising model and QUBO formulations.
Quipper	functional quantum programming language embedded in Haskell.
Quil	Quantum instruction set architecture associated with Rigetti Computing and the Forest quantum programming environment.
Scaffold	C-like quantum programming language built on the LLVM compiler infrastructure.
Silq	High-level quantum programming language developed at ETH Zurich with a static type system.

== Software development kits and frameworks ==
Software	Description
Cirq	Open-source Python framework for creating, manipulating, simulating, and running quantum circuits, especially for NISQ devices.
Libquantum	C library and quantum mechanics simulator originally focused on virtual quantum computers.
OpenFermion	Library for compiling quantum simulation algorithms to Cirq, with applications in quantum chemistry and electronic-structure problems.
PennyLane	Open-source Python library developed by Xanadu Quantum Technologies for differentiable programming of quantum computers and quantum machine learning workflows.
ProjectQ	Open-source quantum computing framework developed at ETH Zurich for creating quantum programs, simulating them, and sending jobs to quantum hardware.
Quantum Development Kit	Microsoft software development kit for quantum algorithm development and simulation, centered on the Q# programming language.
Qiskit	Open-source software development kit for quantum computing originally developed by IBM Research, used to create quantum programs and execute them on simulators or quantum hardware.
Qrisp	Open-source high-level quantum programming framework designed to simplify the implementation and compilation of gate-based quantum algorithms.
Strawberry Fields	Open-source Python library developed by Xanadu Quantum Technologies for designing and simulating photonic and continuous-variable quantum circuits.
TensorFlow Quantum	Extension of TensorFlow for exploring hybrid classical-quantum machine learning algorithms.
TKET	Platform-agnostic quantum compiler and software development kit for optimizing and running quantum programs on gate-based quantum computers.

== Cloud platforms and services ==
Platform	Description
IBM Quantum Platform	Cloud-based quantum computing platform from IBM that provides access to IBM quantum processors, tutorials, courses, simulators, and programmatic workflows using Qiskit and OpenQASM.
Microsoft Azure Quantum	Cloud-based quantum computing platform from Microsoft that provides access to quantum hardware, software, and tools, including Q#, the Quantum Development Kit, Azure Quantum Elements, and resource-estimation tools.

== See also ==
- Glossary of quantum computing
- List of companies involved in quantum computing
- List of quantum algorithms
- List of quantum computing journals
- List of quantum logic gates
- List of quantum processors
- Quantum logic gate
- Quantum machine learning
- Quantum neural network
