= List of companies involved in quantum computing, communication or sensing =

This article lists the companies worldwide engaged in the development of quantum computing, quantum communication and quantum sensing. Quantum computing and communication are two sub-fields of quantum information science, which describes and theorizes information science in terms of quantum physics. While the fundamental unit of classical information is the bit, the basic unit of quantum information is the qubit. Quantum sensing is the third main sub-field of quantum technologies and it focus consists in taking advantage of the quantum states sensitivity to the surrounding environment to perform atomic scale measurements.

== Company details ==
Company	Date initiated	Area	Technology	Affiliate University or Research Institute	Headquarters	Ref
AbaQus	May 1, 2021	Applications	Algorithms	University of British Columbia	Vancouver, Canada	
Accenture	June 14, 2017	Computing			Dublin, Ireland	
AEGIQ	2019	Computing/Communication	Photonics and Integrated Photonics, Quantum Dots, Cryptography, Photonic Quantum Computing		Sheffield, UK	
Agnostiq	2018	Computing	High Performance Computing, Open Source HPC/Quantum Workflow Manager, Quantum Software	University of Toronto, Rotman School of Management, Creative Destruction Lab (CDL)	Toronto, Canada	
Alice&Bob	2020	Computing	Superconducting cat qubits	Laboratoire de Physique de l'Ecole normale supérieure (LPENS), Centre Automatique et Systèmes, Mines Paris, Inria, ENS-PSL, PSL University, CNRS, Sorbonne University	Paris, France	
Aliro Quantum	2019	Computing/Networking	Quantum Development Environment, Quantum Network Simulation/Emulation	Spun out of Narang Lab, Harvard	Boston, MA, US	
Alpine Quantum Technologies	2018	Computing	Trapped Ion	University of Innsbruck and the Institute for Quantum Optics and Quantum Information (IQOQI)	Innsbruck, Austria	
Amazon	2021	Computing	Superconducting	California Institute of Technology	Pasadena, CA, US	
AmberFlux	2019	Computing/Communications	Quantum Programming, Classical Simulation, Optimization, Algorithms, Quantum Financial Services		Hyderabad, India	
Anyon Systems Inc.	2014	Computing	Superconducting quantum processors, cryogenic systems, control electronics, software development kit		Montreal, Canada	
Airbus	2015	Computing	Algorithms		Blagnac, France	
Archer Materials	2018	Computing	Quantum Computing, Semiconductors	University of Sydney, École Polytechnique Fédérale de Lausanne	Adelaide, Australia	
ARQUE Systems	2022	Computing/Hardware	Semiconductor Quantum Dots	RWTH Aachen, Forschungszentrum Jülich	Aachen, Germany	
AT&T	2011	Communication		California Institute of Technology, Fermilab	Dallas, TX, US	
Atom Computing	2018	Computing/Hardware	Cold/Neutral Atoms, Quantum Algorithms	National Science Foundation, CUbit Quantum Initiative	Berkeley, CA, US	
Aliyun (Alibaba Cloud)	July 30, 2015	Computing/Communication	Superconducting	Chinese Academy of Sciences	Hangzhou, China	
Atos		Computing/Communication	Quantum Programming, Classical Simulation, Cryptography		Bezons, France	
AUREA Technology	2010	Quantum Communication, Quantum Cryptography, Quantum Entanglement	Single-photon source, Photon counting, Quantum key distribution, Photonics, Single-photon avalanche diode		Besancon, France	
Automatski	1993	Computing	Applications, Quantum Computers, Quantum Simulators, Quantum Annealers, Classical Solvers		Bengaluru, India	
Baidu	2018	Computing	Algorithms	University of Technology Sydney	Beijing, China	
BEIT	2016	Computing	Quantum Algorithms, Computational Drug Discovery, Quantum Error Correction, Optimization		Krakow, Poland	
Bleximo	2018	Computing	Application Specific Superconducting		Berkeley, CA, US	
Booz Allen Hamilton		Computing			Tysons Corner, VA, US	
Boxcat Inc.	2017	Computing	Quantum Algorithms, Quantum Rendering, Quantum Image Processing, Super-Resolution, Quantum Machine Learning	University of Toronto, UFRN	Toronto, Canada	
BT		Communication			London, UK	
Carl Zeiss AG				University College London	Oberkochen, Germany	
Classiq	2019	Computing	Quantum Algorithms, Quantum Software	Technion – Israel Institute of Technology	Tel-Aviv, Israel	
CogniFrame Inc	2019	Computing	Quantum Algorithms	University of Toronto	Toronto, Ontario, Canada	
ColibrITD	2019	Computing, Platform QaaS	Quantum Algorithms Quantum Software Quantum Platform		Paris, France	
Cosmica	2024	Computing	Quantum Annealers/Emulators/Computers		Orlando, FL, US	
Cube Robot X	2004	Computing	Photonic, Trapped Ion, Quantum Algorithms, Quantum Programming, Robotics	University of applied science in Augsburg (FH)	Langweid am Lech, Bavaria Germany	
Cyberknight Inc.	2023	Computing	Quantum Software		Boston, Massachusetts, United States	
Cystel Limited	2023	Quantum Communication Security, Quantum Cryptography Security	Quantum Security Policy, Quantum Transformation, Quantum key distribution Security, Quantum Cyber Risk Governance and Compliance		England, United Kingdom	
Diraq	2022	Computing	Quantum Dots	University of New South Wales	Sydney, Australia	
D-Wave	January 1, 1999	Computing	Superconducting Quantum Annealer		Burnaby, Canada	
eleQtron	2020	Computing	Trapped Ion	Universität Siegen	Siegen, Germany	
Elyah	2018	Computing	Quantum Programming, Classical Simulation, Software as a service		Tokyo, Japan	
Entangled Networks	2021	Quantum Computing, Quantum Communication	Quantum communication algorithms, Quantum networking fabrics		Toronto, Canada	
Entropica Labs	May 2018	Algorithm	Quantum Algorithms, Quantum Programming, Quantum Machine Learning, Quantum Software Tools, Open Source Software	Center for Quantum Technologies, National University of Singapore	Singapore	
Equal1	2018	Computing	Rack-mounted silicon qubits		Dublin, Ireland	
Fujitsu	September 28, 2015	Communication	Quantum Dots	University of Tokyo	Tokyo, Japan	
FirstQFM	2025	Computing	Quantum foundation models, AI-for-quantum computing, quantum software	—	Stockholm, Sweden	
Google QuAIL	May 16, 2013	Computing	Superconducting	UCSB	Mountain View, CA, US	
Haiqu	2022	Computing	Quantum Middleware for Noisy Intermediate-Scale Quantum Computing (NISQ) devices, Quantum Compilation, Agentic AI for Quantum Computing		New York City, NY, US	
HIQUTE Diamond	2022	Quantum sensing platforms	NV Center for Quantum Sensing	Laboratoire des Sciences des Procédés et des Matériaux	Villetaneuse (Paris), France	
Hitachi	2012	Computing	Silicon CMOS	University of Cambridge, University College London, CEA, University of Copenhagen	Hitachi Cambridge Laboratory, UK and Tokyo, Japan	
Horizon Quantum Computing	2018	Computing	Quantum Algorithms, Quantum Compilation, Quantum Programming, Software as a service	CQT	Singapore	
HP		Computing and Communication	Algorithms, NMR		Palo Alto, CA, US	
HQS Quantum Simulations	2017	Computing	Quantum Algorithms, Quantum Programming, Classical Simulation		Karlsruhe, Germany	
HRL Laboratories		Computing	Quantum Dots		Malibu, CA, US	
Huawei Noah's Ark Lab		Communication		Nanjing University	Shenzhen, China	
IBM	September 10, 1990	Computing	Superconducting	MIT	Armonk, NY, US	
Icarus Quantum	2022	Computing	Photonic Interconnects	NIST	Boulder, CO, US	
ID Quantique	July 1, 2001	Communication			Geneva, Switzerland	
IMEC		Computing	Superconducting		Belgium	-
Infleqtion	2005	Computing, Communication, Sensing	Trapped neutral Cesium atoms.	University of Colorado Boulder, University of Wisconsin-Madison	Boulder, CO, US	
Intel	September 3, 2015	Computing		TU Delft	Santa Clara, CA, US	
Infineon Technologies	2019	Computing	Trapped Ion, Post-Quantum Cryptography	University of Innsbruck	Neubiberg, Germany	
IonQ	2015	Computing	Trapped Ion	University of Maryland, Duke University	College Park, MD, US	
IQM Quantum Computers	2019	Computing	Superconducting	Aalto University	Espoo, Finland	
KEEQuant	2020	Quantum cryptography	Continuous Variable QKD, Key Management Systems (KMS)		Fürth, Germany	
Kipu Quantum	2022	Computing	Quantum Algorithms		Munich, Germany	
KPN		Communication			The Hague, Netherlands	
Kvantify	2022	Computing	Quantum algorithms, Biotech, Pharma, Life Science	Aarhus University	Copenhagen, Denmark	
Lockheed Martin		Computing	Quantum Annealing	University of Southern California, University College London	Bethesda, MD, US	
main incubator	2019	Computing	Quantum Financial Services		Frankfurt, Germany	
MagiQ	1999	Communication			Somerville, MA, US	
Microsoft	April 22, 2005	Computing	Topological, quantum software stack, Quantum algorithms	Niels Bohr Institute, University of Sydney, Purdue University, University of Maryland, ETH Zurich, UCSB	Redmond, WA, US	
Mitsubishi		Communication			Tokyo, Japan	
Nanoacademic Technologies Inc.	2008	Computing, Hardware design, and Communication	Quantum Dots		Montreal, QC, Canada	
NEC Corporation	April 29, 1999	Communication	Quantum Dots	University of Tokyo	Tokyo, Japan	
Next Generation Quantum	2019	Computing and Networking	Optical quantum interconnects for quantum computing clusters	City University of New York	New York, NY, US	
Nokia Bell Labs		Computing		University of Oxford	Murray Hill, NJ, US	
Northrop Grumman		Computing			West Falls Church, VA, US	
NTT Laboratories		Computing/Communication	Photonic Quantum Computing, Quantum Communication	Bristol University	Tokyo, Japan	
Nu Quantum	2018	Communication	Photonic Quantum Computing, Quantum Communication	University of Cambridge	Cambridge, UK	
Oratomic	2026	Computing	Neutral atom fault-tolerant quantum computing	California Institute of Technology	Pasadena, CA, US	
Orca Computing	2019	Computing	Photonic Quantum Computing	University of Oxford	Oxford, UK	
Oxford Ionics	2019	Computing	Trapped ion	University of Oxford	Oxford, UK	
Oxford Quantum Circuits	2017	Computing	Superconducting	University of Oxford	Reading, UK	
ParityQC	2020	Computing	Quantum architecture, Quantum Algorithm, Software-as-a-Service	University of Innsbruck	Innsbruck, Austria	
PASQAL	2019	Computing	Quantum Algorithms Quantum Hardware		Massy, France	
Phasecraft	2018	Computing	Quantum algorithms	Bristol University, University College London	Bristol, England and London, England	
Photon Queue	July 2024	Computing/Communication	Quantum Memory	University of Illinois at Urbana-Champaign	Chicago, IL	
PsiQuantum	2016	Computing	Photonic Quantum Computing	Bristol University	Palo Alto, CA, US	
Q. BPO Consulting	2020	Consulting & Engineering	QML Q-ANN Optimization		Paris, France	
Q.ANT	2018	Computing	Photonic Quantum Computing Quantum Algorithms		Stuttgart, Germany	
Quantized Technologies Inc. (QTI)	2021	Quantum cryptography		University of Calgary	Calgary, Canada	
Qblox	2018	Computing	Quantum Control and Readout		Delft, Netherlands	
qBraid	2020	Computing	Quantum cloud computing, algorithm development, and PoC development		Chicago, IL	
Qclairvoyance Quantum Labs	2024	Quantum Computing, AI/ML	Quantum Algorithms Quantum Computing Software		Secunderabad, TG, India	
QC Ware	2014	Computing	Quantum Algorithms Quantum Computing Software		Palo Alto, CA	
Qedma	2020	Computing	Error reduction	Quantum Computing Software	Tel-Aviv, Israel	
Qilimanjaro Quantum Tech	2019	Computing	Fast-to-market app-specific quantum computers with true quantum benefits by co-designing chips & algorithms and bypassing the qubit fragility barrier	Institute For High Energy Physics (IFAE) Universitat de Barcelona (UB) Barcelona Supercomputing Center (BSC)	Barcelona, Spain	
QNu Labs	2016	Quantum cryptography	Quantum key distribution, Quantum Random Number Generator	IIT Madras	Bangalore, IND, US	
QpiAI	2019	Computing	Quantum Algorithms Quantum Hardware		Bangalore, IND, US	
Qpurpose	2022	Computing	Quantum algorithms and software	University of Southern Denmark (SDU)	Odense, Denmark	
QRCrypto SA	2019	Communication, applied computing	Post-quantum symmetric cryptography. Quantum-resistance testing of cryptography in laboratory environments.	EPFL, Ruhr-Universität Bochum spin-off (cryptanalyses). UAS Western Switzerland (performance tests) and several leading Spanish universities (European projects).	Fribourg, Switzerland	
QRDLab	June 30, 2020	Computing, Consulting, Education	Superconducting	University of Calcutta	Kolkata, India	
Qrypt	2018	Quantum cryptography	Cryptography		New York, US	
QuamCore	2022	Quantum Computing	Superconducting	Technion – Israel Institute of Technology	Herzliya, Israel	
Quandela	2017	Quantum Computing	Photonic Quantum Computing		Palaiseau, France	
Quantagonia	2021	Computing	Quantum Algorithms, Hybrid Computing, Quantum Software		Frankfurt am Main, Germany	
Quantinuum	2021	Computing	Trapped Ion hardware, quantum software stack, quantum algorithms	University of Cambridge	Cambridge, UK and Broomfield, CO, US	
Quantum Art	2022	Computing	Trapped Ion hardware, quantum software stack	Weizmann Institute of Science	Ness Ziona, Israel	
Quantum Benchmark	2017	Computing	Quantum software for co-design of error-robust applications, algorithm performance optimization, cross-platform assessment tools, error detection and suppression		Kitchener, Ontario, Canada	
Quantum Benchmark Labs	2019	Computing	Quantum software for co-design of error-robust applications, algorithm performance optimization, cross-platform assessment tools, error detection and suppression		Berkeley, CA, US	
QxBranch	2014	Computing			Washington, D.C., US	
Quantum Brilliance	2019	Computing	Diamond defect spin	Australian National University	Canberra, Australia	
Quantum Circuits, Inc.	2015	Computing	Superconducting	Yale	Connecticut, US	
Quantum Computing Inc.	2001	Computing	Quantum computing applications		Leesburg, VA, US	
Quantum Machines	2018	Computing	Quantum control electronics and software		Tel Aviv, Israel	
Quantum Source Labs	2021	Computing	Photonic quantum computing (light–matter architecture with deterministic atom–photon gates)	Weizmann Institute of Science	Ness Ziona, Israel	
Quantum Thought	2018	Computing	Quantum Algorithms	San Francisco	California, US	
Qubitrium	2020	Applications	Quantum communication, Information security, Quantum imaging		Istanbul, Turkey	
Qubrid	2023	Quantum Computing, Classical Computing	Hybrid Classical-Quantum Cloud Platform, Quantum Algorithms	McLean	McLean, VA	
Qudora Technologies	2020	Quantum Computing	Microwave controlled trapped ions	Hannover, Braunschweig	Hamburg, Braunschweig, Hannover, GER	
QuEra Computing	2019	Computing	Neutral Atoms	Boston	Massachusetts, US	
QuiX Quantum	2019	Computing	Photonic Quantum Computing		Enschede, NL	
Qulabs.ai	2018	Quantum communication	Quantum cryptography	Quantum key distribution	NJ, US & Hyderabad, IND	
Qunnect Inc.	2017	Quantum Networks	Optical quantum interconnects for quantum communications and etanglement distribution	New York City	New York, US	
Quobly	2022				Grenoble, France	
QuSecure	2019	Communications	Post-Quantum Cryptography	San Mateo	California, US	
Quside	2017	Communication Computing	Photonic Integrated Chips, Quantum Random Number Generators and QRNG chipsets, Entropy Sources, Crypto accelerators, High Performance Computing		Barcelona, Spain	
Raytheon/BBN		Computing/Communication	Superconducting	MIT	Cambridge, MA, US	
Rigetti Computing	2013	Computing	Superconducting	Berkeley	California, US	
Riverlane	2016	Computing	Quantum error correction	Cambridge	England, UK	
SaxonQ	2021	Quantum Computing	Nitrogen-vacancy centers	Leipzig University	Leipzig, Germany	
Seeqc	2019	Quantum Computing, Chip Manufacturing	Quantum Computing, Superconducting Electronics		Elmsford, NY, US	
Silicofeller	2021	Computing	Superconducting	New Delhi	Delhi, India	
Silicon Quantum Computing	2017	Computing	Atom qubits in silicon	University of New South Wales	Sydney, New South Wales, Australia	
Sygaldry Technologies	2024	Computing	Quantum-accelerated AI servers	University of Michigan	Ann Arbor, Michigan, US	
Tabor Quantum Solutions	1971	Computing, Communication, Sensing	Direct RF/uW Large Scale Control Systems		Haifa, Israel	
Terra Quantum	2019	Computing	Quantum Computing, Quantum Metrology & Sensors, Quantum Cryptography, Quantum Random Number Generators		Rorschach, Switzerland	
ThinkQuantum	2021	Communication	Quantum Key Distribution, Quantum Random Number Generators	University of Padova	Sarcedo, Italy	
Toshiba		Communication	Quantum Dots	University of Cambridge	Tokyo, Japan	
Turkcell	1994	Communication	Telecommunication		Istanbul, Turkey	
Taqbit Labs Pvt Ltd	February 2, 2018	Quantum cryptography	Quantum Communication		India	
Universal Quantum	2018	Computing	Trapped Ion	University of Sussex	Hayward's Heath, UK	
Xanadu Quantum Technologies	2016	Computing/Communication	Photonic Quantum Computing		Toronto, Canada	
XeedQ	2021	Computing	Diamond defect spin		Leipzig, Germany	
Zapata Quantum	2017	Computing	Quantum Algorithms and Applications, Quantum Software	Harvard University	Boston, MA, US	
1QBit	December 1, 2012	Computing			Vancouver, Canada	

== See also ==
- Quantum programming
- Quantum supremacy
- List of quantum algorithms
- List of quantum computing journals
- List of quantum processors
- List of quantum software
