= Cloud-based quantum computing =

Remote quantum processors for computation

Cloud-based quantum computing refers to the remote access of quantum computing resources—such as quantum emulators, simulators, or processors—via the internet. Cloud access enables users to develop, test, and execute quantum algorithms without the need for direct interaction with specialized hardware, facilitating broader participation in quantum software development and experimentation.

In 2016, IBM launched the IBM Quantum Experience, one of the first publicly accessible quantum processors connected to the cloud. In early 2017, researchers at Rigetti Computing demonstrated programmable quantum cloud access through their software platform Forest, which included the pyQuil Python library.

Since the early-2020s, cloud-based quantum computing has grown significantly, with multiple providers offering access to a variety of quantum hardware modalities, including superconducting qubits, trapped ions, neutral atoms, and photonic systems. Major platforms such as Amazon Braket, Azure Quantum, and qBraid aggregate quantum devices from hardware developers like IonQ, Rigetti Computing, QuEra, Pasqal, Oxford Quantum Circuits, and IBM Quantum. These platforms provide unified interfaces for users to write and execute quantum algorithms across diverse backends, often supporting open-source SDKs such as Qiskit, Cirq, and PennyLane. The proliferation of cloud-based access has played a key role in accelerating quantum education, algorithm research, and early-stage application development by lowering the barrier to experimentation with real quantum hardware.

Cloud-based quantum computing has expanded access to quantum hardware and tools beyond traditional research laboratories. These platforms support educational initiatives, algorithm development, and early-stage commercial applications.

== Applications ==
Cloud-based quantum computing is used across education, research, and software development, offering remote access to quantum systems without the need for on-site infrastructure.

=== Education ===
Quantum cloud platforms have become valuable tools in education, allowing students and instructors to engage with real quantum processors through user-friendly interfaces. Educators use these platforms to teach foundational concepts in quantum mechanics and quantum computing, as well as to demonstrate and implement quantum algorithms in a classroom or laboratory setting.

=== Scientific Research ===
Cloud-based access to quantum hardware has enabled researchers to conduct experiments in quantum information, test quantum algorithms, and compare quantum hardware platforms. Experiments such as testing Bell's theorem or evaluating quantum teleportation protocols have been performed on publicly available quantum processors.

=== Software Development and Prototyping ===
Developers use cloud-based platforms to prototype quantum software applications across fields such as optimization, machine learning, and chemistry. These platforms offer SDKs and APIs that integrate classical and quantum workflows, enabling experimentation with quantum algorithms in real-world or simulated environments.

=== Public Engagement and Games ===
Quantum cloud tools have also been used to create educational games and interactive applications aimed at increasing public understanding of quantum concepts. These efforts help bridge the gap between theoretical content and intuitive learning.

== Existing platforms ==
- qBraid Lab by qBraid is a cloud-based platform for quantum computing. It provides software tools for researchers and developers in quantum, as well as access to quantum hardware. qBraid provides cloud based access to Microsoft Azure Quantum and Amazon Braket devices including IQM, QuEra, Pasqal, Rigetti, IonQ, QIR simulators, Amazon Braket simulators, and the NEC Vector Annealer, as of August 2025. qBraid's base version is free, where unlimited hardware and simulator access is available with the purchase of credits.
- Quandela Cloud by Quandela is the platform to access first cloud-accessible European photonic quantum computer. The computer is interfaced using the Perceval scripting language, with tutorials and documentation available online for free.
- Xanadu Quantum Cloud by Xanadu is a platform with cloud-based access to three fully programmable photonic quantum computers.
- Forest by Rigetti Computing is a tool suite for cloud-based quantum computing. It includes a programming language, development tools and example algorithms.
- LIQUi> by Microsoft is a software architecture and tool suite for quantum computing. It includes a programming language, example optimization and scheduling algorithms, and quantum simulators.
  - Q#, a quantum programming language by Microsoft on the .NET Framework seen as a successor to LIQUi|>.
- IBM Quantum Platform by IBM, providing access to quantum hardware as well as HPC simulators. These can be accessed programmatically using the Python-based Qiskit framework, or via graphical interface with the IBM Q Experience GUI. Both are based on the OpenQASM standard for representing quantum operations. There is also a tutorial and online community.
- Quantum in the Cloud by The University of Bristol, which consists of a quantum simulator and a four qubit optical quantum system.
- Quantum Playground by Google is an educational resource which features a simulator with a simple interface, and a scripting language and 3D quantum state visualization.
- Quantum Inspire by Qutech is the first platform in Europe providing cloud-based quantum computing to two hardware chips. Next to a 5-qubit transmon processor, Quantum Inspire is the first platform in the world to provide online access to a fully programmable 2-qubit electron spin quantum processor.
- Amazon Braket is a cloud-based quantum computing platform hosted by AWS which, as of June 2025, provides access to quantum computers built by IonQ, Rigetti, IQM, and QuEra. Braket also provides a quantum algorithm development environment and simulator.
- Forge by QC Ware is a cloud-based quantum computing platform that provides access to D-Wave hardware, as well as Google and IBM simulators. The platform offers a 30-day free trial, including one minute of quantum computing time.
- Quantum-as-a-Service by Scaleway is a cloud-based platform created in 2022 to access to real quantum hardware from IQM Quantum Computers, Alpine Quantum Technologies, Quandela and Pasqal. It also include access to GPU-powered emulators such as Aer, Qsim and Quandela proprietary emulation.
- A lot of manufacturers of quantum computing hardware provide their own platform to access the dedicated hardware resources, which is often very comfortable, for example IQM Resonance by IQM Quantum Computers.
- There were earlier attempts to provide an experimental quantum cloud platform for access to a four-qubit nuclear magnetic resonance-NMRCloudQ computer, managed by Tsinghua University. However, as per the 12th of October 2026 the link appears to be inactive.
