= QxBranch =

Computing company based in Washington

QxBranch, Inc.
- Type: Privately held company
- Industry: Computer software
- Founded: September 10, 2014
- Headquarters: Washington, DC, United States
- Area served: Washington, D.C. Adelaide, Australia; London; Hong Kong
- Key people: Dr Ray O. Johnson (Executive Chair); Michael Brett (CEO); Paul Guthrie (Chief Strategy Officer)
- Number of employees: Approx. 15
- Website: www.qxbranch.com

QxBranch, Inc. is a data analysis and quantum computing software company, based in Washington, D.C. The company provides data analytics services and research and development for quantum computing technology. On July 11, 2019, QxBranch announced that it had been acquired by Rigetti Computing, a developer of quantum integrated circuits used for quantum computers.

== Services ==
QxBranch provides predictive analytics services to firms in the banking and finance industries. The company also develops software products for quantum computing technologies, including developer tools and interfaces for quantum computers, as well as quantum computing simulators. Additionally, the company provides consulting and research and development for businesses that may be improved through quantum computing methods, including in the development of adiabatic quantum computing methods for machine learning applications.

== History ==
QxBranch was founded in 2014 as a joint spin-off of Shoal Group and The Tauri Group to commercialize quantum computing technology. Shoal Group (named Aerospace Concepts at the time) had a research agreement with Lockheed Martin to access a D-Wave Two quantum computer, and transitioned the access and associated technology to help found QxBranch.

In August 2014, QxBranch was selected as one of eight participants for Accenture's FinTech Innovation Lab program in Hong Kong.

In May 2015, Ray O. Johnson, former Chief Technology Officer of Lockheed Martin, joined QxBranch as executive director.

In January 2016, Prime Minister of Australia Malcolm Turnbull toured QxBranch's facilities in Washington, D.C. for a demonstration of quantum computing applications.

In November 2016, QxBranch, in partnership with UBS, was announced as a winning bid under the Innovate UK's Quantum Technologies Innovation Fund under the UK National Quantum Technologies Programme. The partnership is working on developing quantum algorithms for foreign exchange market trading and arbitrage.

In April 2017, QxBranch, in partnership with the Commonwealth Bank, released a quantum computing simulator aiming to enable software and algorithm development to assess the feasibility and performance of applications ahead of the development of silicon-based quantum computers. The simulator was modeled on the hardware being developed by the University of New South Wales and made accessible as part of the bank's internal cloud-based systems, allowing developers to design and evaluate software and algorithms concurrently with the hardware's on-going development.

In February 2018, QxBranch demonstrated a quantum deep learning network that simulated the 2016 US Presidential Election, resulting in slightly improved forecasts of the election outcome over those of forecasting site FiveThirtyEight.

In April 2018, IBM announced a collaboration with QxBranch and other companies for research access to its IBM Quantum Experience quantum computers.

== Locations ==
QxBranch is headquartered in Washington, D.C. and has an engineering team in Adelaide, Australia, as well as offices in London and Hong Kong.

== See also ==
- List of Companies involved in Quantum Computing or Communication
- Timeline of quantum computing
- Adiabatic quantum computation
