= Quantum programming =

Computer programming for quantum computers

Quantum programming refers to the process of designing and implementing algorithms that operate on quantum systems, typically using quantum circuits composed of quantum gates, measurements, and classical control logic. These circuits are developed to manipulate quantum states for specific computational tasks or experimental outcomes. Quantum programs may be executed on quantum processors, simulated on classical hardware, or implemented through laboratory instrumentation for research purposes.

When working with quantum processor-based systems, quantum programming languages provide high-level abstractions to express quantum algorithms efficiently. These languages often integrate with classical programming environments and support hybrid quantum-classical workflows. The development of quantum software has been strongly influenced by the open-source community, with many toolkits and frameworks—such as Qrisp, Qiskit, Cirq, PennyLane, and qBraid SDK—available under open licenses.

Quantum programming can also be used to model or control experimental systems through quantum instrumentation and sensor-based platforms. While some quantum computing architectures—such as linear optical quantum computing using the KLM protocol—require specialized hardware, others use gate-based quantum processors accessible through software interfaces. In both cases, quantum programming serves as the bridge between theoretical algorithms and physical implementation.

== Quantum instruction sets ==
Quantum instruction sets are used to turn higher level algorithms into physical instructions that can be executed on quantum processors. Sometimes these instructions are specific to a given hardware platform, e.g. ion traps or superconducting qubits.

=== Blackbird ===
Blackbird is a quantum instruction set and intermediate representation used by Xanadu Quantum Technologies and Strawberry Fields. It is designed to represent continuous-variable quantum programs that can run on photonic quantum hardware.

=== cQASM ===
cQASM, also known as common QASM, is a hardware-agnostic quantum assembly language which guarantees the interoperability between all the quantum compilation and simulation tools. It was introduced by the QCA Lab at TUDelft.

=== OpenQASM ===
OpenQASM is the intermediate representation introduced by IBM for use with Qiskit and the IBM Quantum Platform.

=== QIR ===
Quantum Intermediate Representation (QIR) is a hardware-agnostic intermediate representation developed by Microsoft as part of the Quantum Development Kit. It is based on the LLVM compiler infrastructure and is designed to represent quantum programs in a way that supports optimization and execution across diverse quantum hardware backends. QIR serves as a common target for quantum compilers, enabling interoperation between different programming languages, such as Q#, and low-level hardware control layers. It is maintained by the QIR Alliance, a collaborative group of academic and industry partners.

=== Quil ===
Quil is an instruction set architecture for quantum computing that first introduced a shared quantum/classical memory model. It was introduced by Robert Smith, Michael Curtis, and William Zeng in A Practical Quantum Instruction Set Architecture. Many quantum algorithms (including quantum teleportation, quantum error correction, simulation, and optimization algorithms) require a shared memory architecture.

== Quantum software development kits ==
Quantum software development kits provide collections of tools to create and manipulate quantum programs. They also provide the means to simulate the quantum programs or prepare them to be run using cloud-based quantum devices and self-hosted quantum devices.

=== SDKs with access to quantum processors ===
The following software development kits can be used to run quantum circuits on prototype quantum devices, as well as on simulators.

==== Cirq ====
An open source project developed by Google, which uses the Python programming language to create and manipulate quantum circuits. Programs written in Cirq can be run on IonQ, Pasqal, Rigetti, and Alpine Quantum Technologies.

==== Classiq ====
A cloud-based quantum IDE developed by Classiq, uses a high-level quantum language, Qmod, to generate scalable and efficient quantum circuits with a hardware-aware synthesis engine, that can be deployed across a wide range of QPUs. The platform includes a large library of quantum algorithms.

==== Forest ====
An open source project developed by Rigetti, which uses the Python programming language to create and manipulate quantum circuits. Results are obtained either using simulators or prototype quantum devices provided by Rigetti. As well as the ability to create programs using basic quantum operations, higher level algorithms are available within the Grove package. Forest is based on the Quil instruction set.

==== MindQuantum ====
MindQuantum is a quantum computing framework based on MindSpore, focusing on the implementation of NISQ algorithms.

==== Ocean ====
An open source suite of tools developed by D-Wave. Written mostly in the Python programming language, it enables users to formulate problems in Ising Model and Quadratic Unconstrained Binary Optimization formats (QUBO). Results can be obtained by submitting to an online quantum computer in Leap, D-Wave's real-time Quantum Application Environment, customer-owned machines, or classical samplers.

==== PennyLane ====
An open-source Python library developed by Xanadu Quantum Technologies for differentiable programming of quantum computers. PennyLane provides users the ability to create models using TensorFlow, NumPy, or PyTorch, and connect them with quantum computer backends available from IBMQ, Google Quantum, Rigetti, Quantinuum and Alpine Quantum Technologies.

==== Perceval ====
An open-source project created by Quandela for designing photonic quantum circuits and developing quantum algorithms, based on Python. Simulations are run either on the user's own computer or on the cloud. Perceval is also used to connect to Quandela's cloud-based photonic quantum processor.

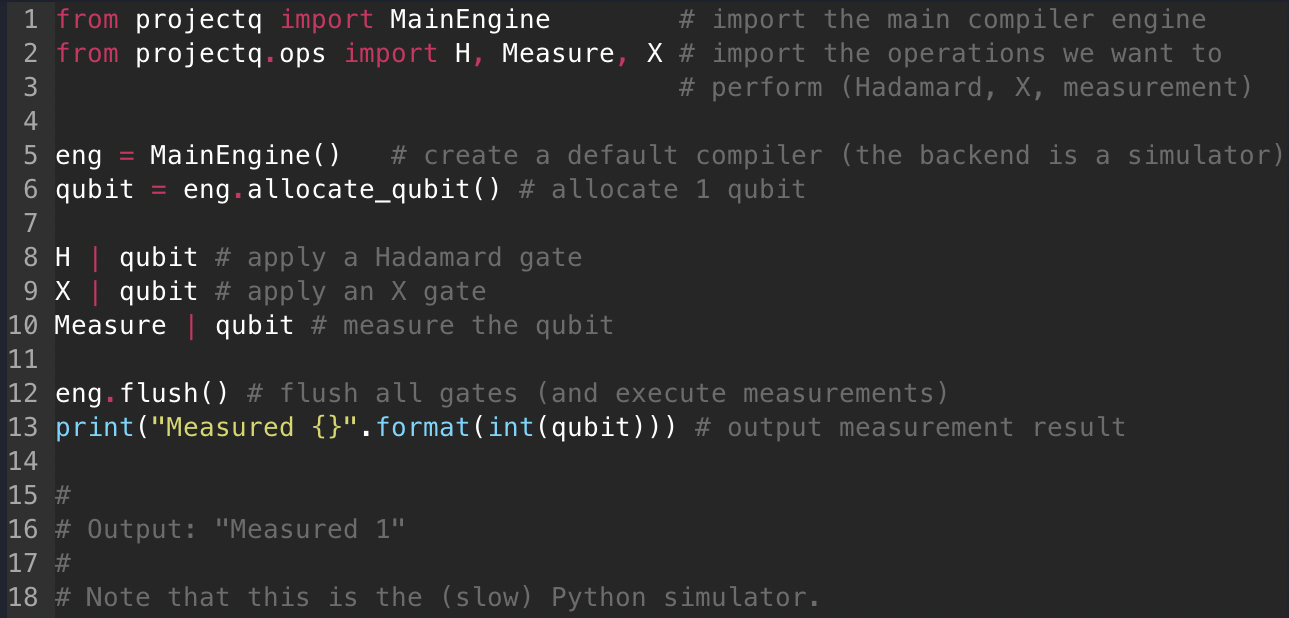
Sample code using projectq with Python

==== ProjectQ ====
An open source project developed at the Institute for Theoretical Physics at ETH, which uses the Python programming language to create and manipulate quantum circuits. Results are obtained either using a simulator, or by sending jobs to IBM quantum devices.

==== qBraid SDK ====
The qBraid SDK is an open-source platform-agnostic quantum runtime framework developed by qBraid. It enables users to write quantum programs once and execute them across various quantum hardware and simulators without modifying the code. The SDK supports multiple quantum programming libraries, including Qiskit, Cirq, PennyLane, PyQuil, and Braket, among others. It features a graph-based transpiler that facilitates conversion between different quantum program types, allowing seamless interoperability between frameworks. The SDK also provides tools for job submission, result retrieval, and circuit visualization. It is integrated with qBraid Lab, offering access to over 20 quantum devices and simulators from providers such as IonQ, Rigetti, QuEra, and IQM.

==== Qibo ====
An open source full-stack API for quantum simulation, quantum hardware control and calibration developed by multiple research laboratories, including QRC, CQT and INFN. Qibo is a modular framework which includes multiple backends for quantum simulation and hardware control. This project aims at providing a platform agnostic quantum hardware control framework with drivers for multiple instruments and tools for quantum calibration, characterization and validation. This framework focuses on self-hosted quantum devices by simplifying the software development required in labs.

==== Qiskit ====
An open source project developed by IBM. Quantum circuits are created and manipulated using Python. Results are obtained either using simulators that run on the user's own device, simulators provided by IBM or prototype quantum devices provided by IBM. As well as the ability to create programs using basic quantum operations, higher level tools for algorithms and benchmarking are available within specialized packages. Qiskit is based on the OpenQASM standard for representing quantum circuits. It also supports pulse level control of quantum systems via QiskitPulse standard.

==== Qrisp ====
Qrisp is an open source project coordinated by the Eclipse Foundation and developed in Python programming by Fraunhofer FOKUS Qrisp is a high-level programming language for creating and compiling quantum algorithms. Its structured programming model enables scalable development and maintenance. The expressive syntax is based on variables instead of qubits, with the QuantumVariable as core class, and functions instead of gates. Additional tools, such as a performant simulator and automatic uncomputation, complement the extensive framework. Furthermore, it is platform independent, since it offers alternative compilation of elementary functions down to the circuit level, based on device-specific gate sets.

==== Quantum Development Kit ====
A project developed by Microsoft as part of the .NET Framework. Quantum programs can be written and run within Visual Studio and VSCode using the quantum programming language Q#. Programs developed in the QDK can be run on Microsoft's Azure Quantum, and run on quantum computers from Quantinuum, IonQ, and Pasqal.

==== Strawberry Fields ====
An open-source Python library developed by Xanadu Quantum Technologies for designing, simulating, and optimizing continuous variable (CV) quantum optical circuits. Three simulators are provided—one in the Fock basis, one using the Gaussian formulation of quantum optics, and one using the TensorFlow machine learning library. Strawberry Fields is also the library for executing programs on Xanadu's quantum photonic hardware.

==== t|ket> ====
A quantum programming environment and optimizing compiler developed by Quantinuum that targets simulators and several trapped-ion quantum hardware backends, released in December 2018.

==== Wolfram Quantum Framework ====
An add-on Wolfram Language paclet that provides a symbolic, high-level representation for quantum objects such as basis, states, operators, channels, measurements, and circuits, integrated with Mathematica. The framework includes tools for simulation and analysis—such as time evolution, measurement simulation, entanglement monotones, partial trace/transpose, discrete Wigner transforms, stabilizer methods, and tensor-network utilities—as well as a library of named constructs (e.g., Bell/GHZ states, Pauli operators, Fourier, Grover etc.). It offers built-in visualization (e.g., circuit diagrams and Bloch-sphere plots) and interoperability with external platforms, including conversion to Qiskit and Amazon Braket formats and the ability to send queries to quantum processing units (QPUs) via service connections.

== Quantum programming languages ==
There are two main groups of quantum programming languages: imperative quantum programming languages and functional quantum programming languages.

=== Imperative languages ===
The most prominent representatives of the imperative languages are QCL, LanQ and Q|SI>.

==== Guppy ====
Guppy is an open-source quantum programming language that was developed at Quantinuum. It is embedded in Python, and designed to express programs containing complex control flow in Pythonic syntax, as illustrated in the example below:

from guppylang import guppy
from guppylang.std.quantum import qubit, toffoli, s, z, measure
from guppylang.std.quantum.functional import h

@guppy
def rz_acos_3_5(q: qubit, max_tries: int) -> bool:
    """
    Repeat-until-success circuit for Rz(acos(3/5))
    from Nielsen and Chuang, Fig. 4.17.
    """
    for i in range(max_tries):
        a, b = h(qubit()), h(qubit())
        toffoli(a, b, q)
        s(q)
        toffoli(a, b, q)
        m_a = measure(h(a))
        m_b = measure(h(b))
        if not m_a.read() and not m_b.read():
            output("num_failed_attempts", i)
            return True
        z(q)
    output("num_failed_attempts", max_tries)
    return False

In Guppy, qubits are linear types, and the compiler tries to enforce linearity (preventing qubits from being leaked or copied, for example).

The Guppy compiler is packaged with an emulator. Programs are compiled to an intermediate representation called HUGR, suitable for submission to Quantinuum's quantum devices.

==== Ket ====
Ket is an open-source embedded language designed to facilitate quantum programming, leveraging the familiar syntax and simplicity of Python. It serves as an integral component of the Ket Quantum Programming Platform, seamlessly integrating with a Rust runtime library and a quantum simulator. Maintained by Quantuloop, the project emphasizes accessibility and versatility for researchers and developers. The following example demonstrates the implementation of a Bell state using Ket:

from ket import *
a, b = quant(2) # Allocate two quantum bits
H(a) # Put qubit `a` in a superposition
cnot(a, b) # Entangle the two qubits in the Bell state
m_a = measure(a) # Measure qubit `a`, collapsing qubit `b` as well
m_b = measure(b) # Measure qubit `b`
# Assert that the measurement of both qubits will always be equal
assert m_a.value == m_b.value

==== LQP ====
The Logic of Quantum Programs (LQP) is a dynamic quantum logic, capable of expressing important features of quantum measurements and unitary evolutions of multi-partite states, and provides logical characterizations of various forms of entanglement. The logic has been used to specify and verify the correctness of various protocols in quantum computation.

==== Q language ====
Q Language is the second implemented imperative quantum programming language. Q Language was implemented as an extension of C++ programming language. It provides classes for basic quantum operations like QHadamard, QFourier, QNot, and QSwap, which are derived from the base class Qop. New operators can be defined using C++ class mechanism.

Quantum memory is represented by class Qreg.

Qreg x1; // 1-qubit quantum register with initial value 0
Qreg x2(2,0); // 2-qubit quantum register with initial value 0

The computation process is executed using a provided simulator. Noisy environments can be simulated using parameters of the simulator.

==== Q# ====
A language developed by Microsoft to be used with the Quantum Development Kit.

==== QCL ====
Quantum Computation Language (QCL) is one of the first implemented quantum programming languages. The most important feature of QCL is the support for user-defined operators and functions. Its syntax resembles the syntax of the C programming language and its classical data types are similar to primitive data types in C. One can combine classical code and quantum code in the same program.

==== qGCL ====
Quantum Guarded Command Language (qGCL) was defined by P. Zuliani in his PhD thesis. It is based on Guarded Command Language created by Edsger Dijkstra.

It can be described as a language of quantum programs specification.

==== QMASM ====
Quantum Macro Assembler (QMASM) is a low-level language specific to quantum annealers such as the D-Wave.

==== Qmod ====
Quantum Modeling (Qmod) language is a high-level language that abstracts away the gate-level qubit operation, providing a functional approach to the implementation of quantum algorithms on quantum registers. The language is part of the Classiq platform and can be used directly with its native syntax, through a Python SDK, or with a visual editor, all methods can take advantage of the larger library of algorithms and the efficient circuit optimization.

==== Q|SI> ====
Q|SI> is a platform embedded in .Net language supporting quantum programming in a quantum extension of while-language. This platform includes a compiler of the quantum while-language and a chain of tools for the simulation of quantum computation, optimisation of quantum circuits, termination analysis of quantum programs, and verification of quantum programs.

==== Quantum pseudocode ====
Quantum pseudocode proposed by E. Knill is the first formalized language for description of quantum algorithms. It was introduced and, moreover, was tightly connected with a model of quantum machine called Quantum Random Access Machine (QRAM).

==== Scaffold ====
Scaffold is a C-like language, that compiles to QASM and OpenQASM. It is built on top of the LLVM Compiler Infrastructure to perform optimizations on Scaffold code before generating a specified instruction set.

==== Silq ====
Silq is a high-level programming language for quantum computing with a strong static type system, developed at ETH Zürich.

=== Functional languages ===
Efforts are underway to develop functional programming languages for quantum computing. Functional programming languages are well-suited for reasoning about programs. Examples include Selinger's QPL, and the Haskell-like language QML by Altenkirch and Grattage. Higher-order quantum programming languages, based on lambda calculus, have been proposed by van Tonder, Selinger and Valiron and by Arrighi and Dowek.

==== LIQUi|> ====
LIQUi|> (pronounced liquid) is a quantum simulation extension on the F# programming language. It is currently being developed by the Quantum Architectures and Computation Group (QuArC) part of the StationQ efforts at Microsoft Research. LIQUi|> seeks to allow theorists to experiment with quantum algorithm design before physical quantum computers are available for use.

It includes a programming language, optimization and scheduling algorithms, and quantum simulators. LIQUi|> can be used to translate a quantum algorithm written in the form of a high-level program into the low-level machine instructions for a quantum device.

==== QFC and QPL ====
QFC and QPL are two closely related quantum programming languages defined by Peter Selinger. They differ only in their syntax: QFC uses a flow chart syntax, whereas QPL uses a textual syntax. These languages have classical control flow but can operate on quantum or classical data. Selinger gives a denotational semantics for these languages in a category of superoperators.

==== QML ====
QML is a Haskell-like quantum programming language by Altenkirch and Grattage. Unlike Selinger's QPL, this language takes duplication, rather than discarding, of quantum information as a primitive operation. Duplication in this context is understood to be the operation that maps $|\phi\rangle$ to $|\phi\rangle\otimes|\phi\rangle$, and is not to be confused with the impossible operation of cloning; the authors claim it is akin to how sharing is modeled in classical languages. QML also introduces both classical and quantum control operators, whereas most other languages rely on classical control.

An operational semantics for QML is given in terms of quantum circuits, while a denotational semantics is presented in terms of superoperators, and these are shown to agree. Both the operational and denotational semantics have been implemented (classically) in Haskell.

==== Quantum lambda calculi ====
Quantum lambda calculi are extensions of the classical lambda calculus introduced by Alonzo Church and Stephen Cole Kleene in the 1930s. The purpose of quantum lambda calculi is to extend quantum programming languages with a theory of higher-order functions.

The first attempt to define a quantum lambda calculus was made by Philip Maymin in 1996. His lambda-q calculus is powerful enough to express any quantum computation. However, this language can efficiently solve NP-complete problems, and therefore appears to be strictly stronger than the standard quantum computational models (such as the quantum Turing machine or the quantum circuit model). Therefore, Maymin's lambda-q calculus is probably not implementable on a physical device.

In 2003, André van Tonder defined an extension of the lambda calculus suitable for proving correctness of quantum programs. He also provided an implementation in the Scheme programming language.

In 2004, Selinger and Valiron defined a strongly typed lambda calculus for quantum computation with a type system based on linear logic.

==== Quipper ====
Quipper was published in 2013. It is implemented as an embedded language, using Haskell as the host language. For this reason, quantum programs written in Quipper are written in Haskell using provided libraries. For example, the following code implements preparation of a superposition

import Quipper

spos :: Bool -> Circ Qubit
spos b = do q <- qinit b
            r <- hadamard q
            return r

== See also ==
- List of quantum computing journals
- List of quantum algorithms
- List of quantum software
