= Microsoft Azure Quantum =

Quantum Computing Division/Software

- Developer: Microsoft
- Release: February 1, 2021; 5 years ago

Microsoft Azure Quantum is a public cloud-based quantum computing platform developed by Microsoft, that offers quantum hardware, software, and solutions for developers to build quantum applications. It supports variety of quantum hardware architectures from partners including Quantinuum, IonQ, and Atom Computing. To run applications on the cloud platform, Microsoft developed the Q# quantum programming language.

Azure Quantum also includes a platform for scientific research, Azure Quantum Elements. It uses artificial intelligence, high-performance computing and quantum processors to run molecular simulations and calculations in computational chemistry and materials science.

Azure Quantum was first announced at Microsoft Ignite in 2019. The platform was opened for public preview in 2021, and Azure Quantum Elements was launched in 2023.

== Hardware ==
In addition to its hardware partners on the platform, Microsoft is developing a topological quantum computer with qubits that are inherently resistant to error. The approach is based on Majorana quasiparticles, which act as their own antiparticles and have a charge and energy equal to zero, making qubits that are more resilient to disturbances.

In September 2023, Azure Quantum researchers found evidence consistent with the creation and control of Majorana quasiparticles for topological quantum computing.

In November 2024, the qubit virtualization system created 24 entangled logical qubits – a new record – on a neutral atom processor. The work demonstrated detection and correction of errors while performing computations, including the first demonstration on record of loss correction in a commercial neutral-atom system from Atom Computing.

Microsoft has also introduced three levels of implementation for quantum computing: foundational (noisy intermediate-scale qubits), resilient (reliable logical qubits), and scale (quantum supercomputers).

In 2024, Microsoft applied a qubit virtualization system to Quantinuum's trapped ion quantum computer to create 12 logical qubits, the most reliable logical qubits on record at the time. The work built upon a previous demonstration that reached error rates 800 times better than the achievement of the same quantum computer without virtualization.

Microsoft and Photonic also performed a teleported CNOT gate between qubits physically separated by 40 meters. The work confirmed remote quantum entanglement between T-centers - a requirement for long-distance quantum communication.

In 2025, Microsoft reported the creation of Majorana 1, which is the world's first quantum chip powered by a topological core architecture. The work created a new class of materials called topoconductors, which use topological superconductivity to control hardware-protected topological qubits. The research utilized a method to determine fermion parity in Majorana zero modes in a single shot – validating a necessary ingredient for utility-scale topological quantum computation architectures based on measurement.

== Software ==
For quantum applications, Azure Quantum developed Q# (pronunciation: Q Sharp), a quantum programming language, and an open-source software development kit for quantum algorithm development and simulation.

The Azure Quantum Resource Estimator estimates resources required to execute a given quantum algorithm on a fault-tolerant quantum computer.

In 2023, Azure Quantum Elements added Microsoft Copilot, a GPT-4 based large language model tool to query and visualize data, write code, and initiate simulations.

The same year, Microsoft developed Quantum Intermediate Representation (QIR) from LLVM as a common interface between programming languages and target quantum processors.

Microsoft also developed gate-efficient algorithmic methods to perform faster Trotter steps with lower gate complexity, enabling efficient quantum simulations that reduce the required quantum hardware resources.

== Azure Quantum Elements ==
The Azure Quantum Elements platform combines artificial intelligence (AI) and traditional high-performance computing with quantum tools for materials science, chemistry and pharmaceutical research. The platform uses physics-based AI models and advanced algorithms to process complex research data and draw conclusions.

In January 2024, Microsoft and Pacific Northwest National Laboratory used AI and HPC to model and screen 32 million new candidate materials to develop a more efficient rechargeable battery material. The joint project generated new material candidates, then conducted a hyper-accelerated search among them to reach a single suitable candidate that could potentially replace the lithium-ion.

In July 2024, Microsoft released a Generative Chemistry tool for Azure Quantum Elements that uses generative AI to identify the right molecules to use for a particular application. Microsoft also released an Accelerated Density Functional Theory tool to simulate simulations of a molecule's electronic structure using density functional theory (DFT).

Microsoft also used two logical qubits integrated with AI and cloud high-performance computing to solve a practical chemistry problem. According to Microsoft, this case study on catalytic reactions producing chiral molecules represents the first time an HPC system, AI, and quantum computing hardware have been deployed together to solve a specific scientific problem.

In pharmaceuticals, Azure Quantum Elements and HPC platform was integrated with 1910 Gentetics' computational and wet lab biological information, laboratory automation powered by robotics and multimodal AI models for drug discovery.

== See also ==
- List of quantum algorithms
- List of quantum computing software
- List of quantum processors
