= Phasecraft =

British quantum computing software company

- Type: Private
- Industry: Quantum computing software
- Founded: 19 February 2018 (incorporated)
- Founders: Toby Cubitt, Ashley Montanaro, John Morton
- Headquarters: London and Bristol, England; Arlington County, Virginia, US
- Key people: Ashley Montanaro (CEO); Toby Cubitt (CTO); Ian Hogarth (chair)
- Number of employees: 40 (2025)
- Website: www.phasecraft.io

Phasecraft is a British company that develops quantum algorithms and software for quantum computers. It was founded by the academics Toby Cubitt, Ashley Montanaro and John Morton as a spin-out from University College London (UCL) and the University of Bristol. Rather than building its own hardware, the company designs algorithms for machines made by other firms, with a focus on simulating materials and chemistry and on optimisation problems. It is based in London and Bristol and has a US headquarters in Arlington County, Virginia.

== History ==
=== Founding ===
Phasecraft Limited was incorporated in February 2018 under the name Phaseworks Limited and took its current name in June 2018. In June 2018 Montanaro and Morton gave evidence to the House of Commons Science and Technology Committee's inquiry into quantum technologies, where Montanaro described himself as a co-founder of the company. The Financial Times and The Times date its spin-out from UCL and Bristol to 2019. At the time Cubitt and Morton were academics at UCL and Montanaro at Bristol.

In 2019 the company raised £750,000 in pre-seed funding, led by the UCL Technology Fund with Parkwalk Advisors and the London Co-investment Fund.

=== Funding and growth ===
In September 2020 Phasecraft became a partner in a £10 million consortium, led by Rigetti Computing and part-funded by the UK government, to build the UK's first commercially available quantum computer at Abingdon, Oxfordshire. The other partners included Oxford Instruments, the University of Edinburgh and Standard Chartered. Phasecraft's role was to develop algorithms for the machine and to study quantum approaches to materials design, energy and pharmaceuticals. In 2021 the BBC reported that Phasecraft would use the machine to work on energy problems such as improving batteries.

In December 2020 Phasecraft raised $5 million (£3.7 million) in a seed round led by LocalGlobe, with Episode 1. Ian Hogarth joined as chair. The company then had about ten employees. In 2021 it joined IBM's Quantum Network, which gave it cloud access to IBM's quantum computers.

In August 2023 Phasecraft raised £13 million in a Series A round led by Playground Global. In September 2025 it raised $34 million in a Series B round co-led by the venture capital firms Plural and Playground Global and by Novo Holdings, an investment company linked to Novo Nordisk. Existing investors LocalGlobe, AlbionVC and Parkwalk Advisors also took part. The company said it planned to use the money to double its team of 40. The Financial Times reported the round as a sign that specialised quantum software companies were attracting more investment, although the sums remained small compared with those raised by hardware companies.

=== United States ===
In 2024 Phasecraft opened its first office outside the UK, in Washington, D.C., led by Steve Flammia, previously a principal research scientist at the Amazon Web Services Center for Quantum Computing. In September 2026 the Governor of Virginia announced that the company would establish its US headquarters in the Ballston area of Arlington County, with plans to create 19 jobs.

== Approach ==
Phasecraft focuses on algorithms that could run on near-term quantum computers, which are small and prone to errors. Its methods often combine quantum and classical computation. The algorithms are designed to work on hardware from several manufacturers. In 2025 the Financial Times named Google and IBM among its collaborators, and The Times listed machines from Google Quantum AI, IBM, Quantinuum and QuEra as compatible.

John Gapper of the Financial Times wrote in 2025 that this approach let British quantum software companies such as Phasecraft and Riverlane avoid betting on a single hardware technology, and that software needed less capital than building machines. He asked whether such companies would be bought by US technology firms or grow into large independent businesses. Montanaro said he saw "no reason why a quantum software company cannot stay independent for the long term".

== Research ==
In December 2020 researchers from Phasecraft and the University of Bristol published estimates in Physical Review B suggesting that a hybrid quantum and classical method could study the Fermi-Hubbard model, a model of electrons in solids, using about 8,000 quantum gates. This was about a tenth of the number previously thought necessary. Andrew Childs of the University of Maryland told Fortune that the work suggested "surprisingly low-depth circuits could provide useful information about this model".

In 2022 researchers from Phasecraft, the University of Bristol and Google Quantum AI reported in Nature Communications a scalable algorithm for observing ground-state properties of the Fermi-Hubbard model, run on one of Google's superconducting processors. In January 2024 the company published methods for simulating materials on near-term hardware. These use classical computation to build an efficient description of a material before refining it on a quantum computer. The authors applied the approach to more than 40 materials to indicate which might be simulated sooner. Phasecraft says it has developed a hybrid approach to density functional theory in which a quantum algorithm speeds up one step of the calculation.

With the University of Nottingham and QuEra, Phasecraft has taken part in a project in Wellcome Leap's Quantum for Bio programme that received more than $1 million to study quantum methods for drug discovery for myotonic dystrophy. In September 2026 Phasecraft and Nvidia announced a dataset of more than 3,000 emulated variational quantum eigensolver calculations, produced on Nvidia hardware as part of that programme. The Next Web noted that the company had cited no paper or preprint for its claimed 15-fold speed-up.

== Contracts and partnerships ==
In 2024 Phasecraft won a UK government contract worth about £1 million to develop quantum algorithms for optimising energy grids. In October 2025 it launched Mondrian, a software platform that combines quantum and classical computing for optimisation problems. It was developed with the National Energy System Operator and funded through the government's Quantum Catalyst Fund. In 2025 The Times reported that the company's algorithms were being used in work with the National Energy System Operator, BT and Johnson Matthey.

In March 2026 Phasecraft said it had joined the DARPA Quantum Benchmarking Initiative, which aims to establish whether an industrially useful quantum computer can be built by 2033. According to the company, it contributes to verification and validation work under a contract with the University of Maryland's Applied Research Laboratory for Intelligence and Security. In 2026 ARPA-E selected Phasecraft for its Quantum Computing for Computational Chemistry programme. The award of $4,519,658 funds work to simulate catalysts for producing hydrogen by electrolysis, with the aim of reducing reliance on iridium.

== Public policy ==
In September 2024 Montanaro and Cubitt published a paper warning that cuts to public funding for quantum computing risked "squandering decades of investment" and could leave Britain relying on other countries to share the benefits of the technology. The Department for Science, Innovation and Technology responded that it remained committed to the quantum sector. In 2025 Montanaro told The Daily Telegraph that delivery of government funding had lagged behind, "especially on the software side".

== Leadership ==
Montanaro is chief executive and is also professor of quantum computation at the University of Bristol. Cubitt is chief technology officer. Hogarth, a co-founder of the venture capital firm Plural, has chaired the company since 2020.

== See also ==
- List of companies involved in quantum computing, communication or sensing
