= Superoperator =

In physics, a linear operator acting on a vector space of linear operators

In physics, a superoperator is a linear operator acting on a vector space of linear operators.

Sometimes the term refers more specially to a completely positive map which also preserves or does not increase the trace of its argument. This specialized meaning is used extensively in the field of quantum computing, especially quantum programming, as they characterise mappings between density matrices.

The use of the super- prefix here is in no way related to its other use in mathematical physics. That is to say superoperators have no connection to supersymmetry and superalgebra which are extensions of the usual mathematical concepts defined by extending the ring of numbers to include Grassmann numbers. Since superoperators are themselves operators the use of the super- prefix is used to distinguish them from the operators upon which they act.

== Left/right multiplication ==
Fix a choice of basis for the underlying Hilbert space $\{| i\rangle\}_i$.

Defining the left and right multiplication superoperators by $\mathcal{L}(A)[\rho] = A\rho$ and $\mathcal{R}(A)[\rho] = \rho A$ respectively one can express the commutator as

$$[A,\rho] = \mathcal{L}(A)[\rho] - \mathcal{R}(A)[\rho].$$

Next we vectorize the matrix $\rho$ via stacking rows, which is the mapping

$$\rho = \sum_{i,j} \rho_{ij} | i\rangle \langle j | \mapsto |\rho\rangle\!\rangle = \sum_{i,j} \rho_{ij} | i\rangle\otimes | j \rangle,$$

where $|\cdot\rangle\!\rangle$ denotes a vector in the Fock-Liouville space. The matrix representation of $\mathcal{L}(A)$ is then calculated by using the same mapping

$$A\rho = \sum_{i,j} \rho_{ij}A | i\rangle\langle j| \mapsto \sum_{i,j} \rho_{ij}(A| i\rangle)\otimes| j \rangle =   \sum_{i,j} \rho_{ij}(A\otimes I) (| i\rangle\otimes| j \rangle) = (A\otimes I)|\rho\rangle\!\rangle = \mathcal{L}(A)[\rho],$$

indicating that $\mathcal{L}(A) = A \otimes I$. Similarly one can show that $\mathcal{R}(A) = (I\otimes A^T)$. Similarly, one could also vectorize the matrix $\rho$ via stacking columns, which is the mapping

$\rho = \sum_{i,j} \rho_{ij} | i\rangle \langle j | \mapsto |\rho\rangle\!\rangle = \sum_{i,j} \rho_{ij} | j\rangle\otimes | i \rangle.$

In general form, the left and right multiplication superoperators are given by,

$A \rho B \longrightarrow (A \otimes B^{T}) |\rho \rangle\!\rangle \qquad \text{if row-stacked;} \qquad A \rho B \longrightarrow (B^{T} \otimes A) |\rho \rangle\!\rangle \qquad \text{else if column-stacked.}$

These representations allows us to calculate things like eigenvalues associated to superoperators. These eigenvalues are particularly useful in the field of open quantum systems, where the real parts of the Lindblad superoperator's eigenvalues will indicate whether a quantum system will relax or not.

== Examples ==
=== Von Neumann's equation ===
In quantum mechanics the Schrödinger equation,

$$i \hbar \frac{\partial}{\partial t}\Psi = \hat H \Psi$$,

expresses the time evolution of the state vector $\psi$ by the action of the Hamiltonian $\hat{H}$ which is an operator mapping state vectors to state vectors.

In the more general formulation of John von Neumann, statistical states and ensembles are expressed by density operators rather than state vectors. In this context the time evolution of the density operator is expressed via the von Neumann equation in which density operator is acted upon by a superoperator $\mathcal{H}$ mapping operators to operators. It is defined by taking the commutator with respect to the Hamiltonian operator:

$$i \hbar \frac{\partial}{\partial t}\rho = \mathcal{H}[\rho]$$

where

$$\mathcal{H}[\rho] = [\hat{H},\rho] \equiv \hat{H}\rho - \rho\hat{H}$$

As commutator brackets are used extensively in quantum mechanics this explicit superoperator presentation of the Hamiltonian's action is typically omitted.

=== Derivatives of functions on the space of operators ===
When considering an operator valued function of operators $\hat{H} = \hat{H}(\hat{P})$ as for example when we define the quantum mechanical Hamiltonian of a particle as a function of the position and momentum operators, we may (for whatever reason) define an “Operator Derivative” $\frac{\Delta \hat{H}}{\Delta \hat{P}}$ as a superoperator mapping an operator to an operator.

For example, if $H(P) = P^3 = PPP$ then its operator derivative is the superoperator defined by:

$$\frac{\Delta H}{\Delta P}[X] = X P^2 + PXP + P^2X$$

This “operator derivative” is simply the Jacobian matrix of the function (of operators) where one simply treats the operator input and output as vectors and expands the space of operators in some basis. The Jacobian matrix is then an operator (at one higher level of abstraction) acting on that vector space (of operators).
