= Fraunhofer Institute for Open Communication Systems =

German research institute

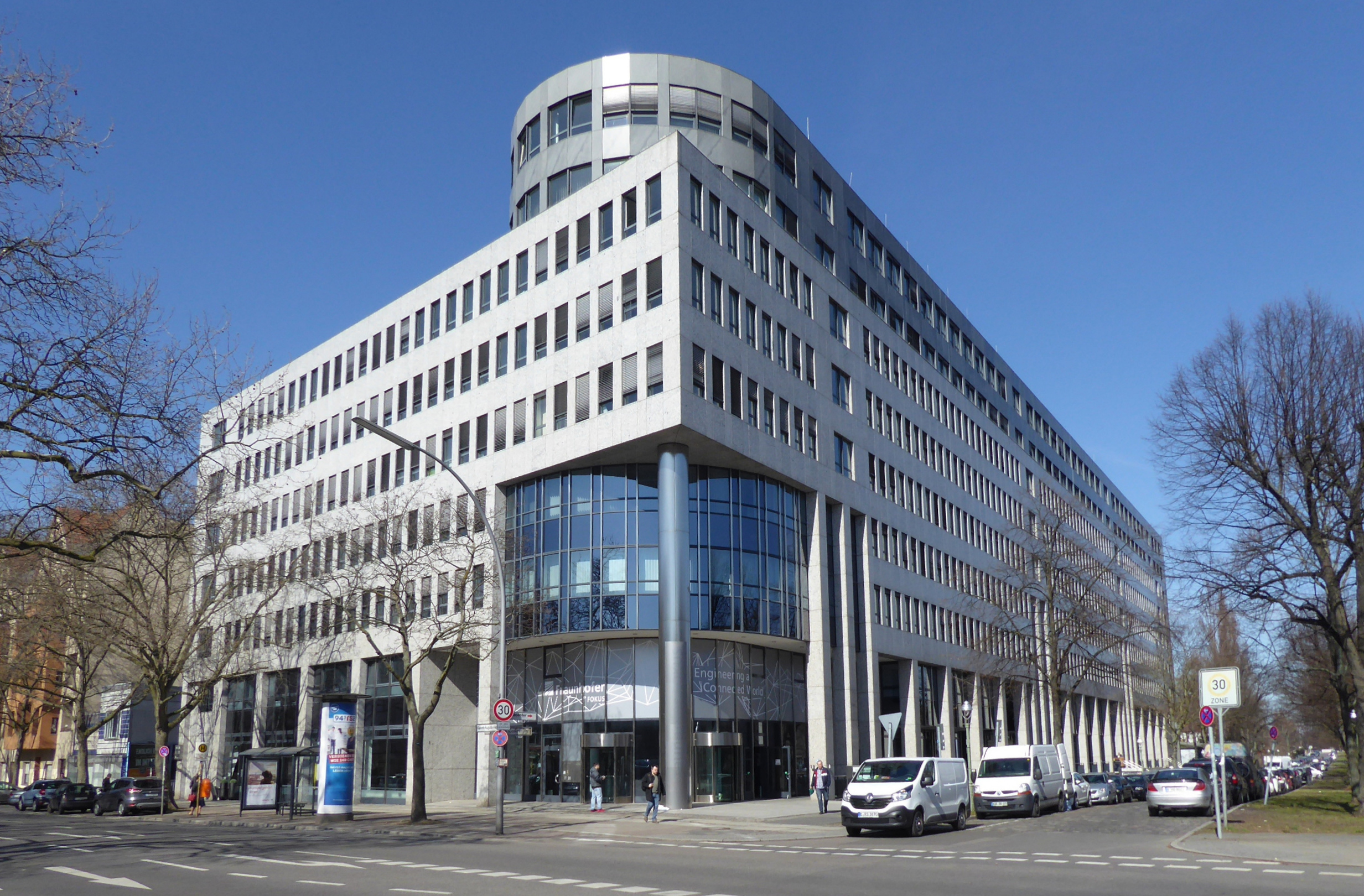
- Institute-Building at Kaiserin-Augusta-Allee
- Other name: German: Fraunhofer-Institut für Offene Kommunikationssysteme; Fraunhofer FOKUS; FOKUS
- Parent institution: Fraunhofer-Gesellschaft
- Established: 1988; 38 years ago
- Focus: Information and communications technology
- Executive Director: Prof. Dr. Manfred Hauswirth
- Staff: 494 (as of 2024)
- Budget: €42.6 million (as of 2023)
- Formerly called: Fraunhofer Institute for Computer Architecture and Software Engineering
- Location: Kaiserin-Augusta-Allee 31, Charlottenburg, Berlin, Germany
- Coordinates: 52°31′35″N 13°18′51″E
- Interactive map of Fraunhofer Institute for Open Communication Systems
- Website: fokus.fraunhofer.de/en/ (in English); fokus.fraunhofer.de (in German)

The Fraunhofer Institute for Open Communication Systems (German: Fraunhofer-Institut für Offene Kommunikationssysteme), abbreviated as FOKUS and known as the Fraunhofer FOKUS, is a research institute of the Fraunhofer Society, located in Charlottenburg, Berlin, Germany. The institute is engaged in applied research and development in the field of information and communications technology. The institute is led by Prof. Manfred Hauswirth, who also holds a chair at the Technische Universität Berlin. Dr. Tom Ritter is the institute's deputy director.

== History ==
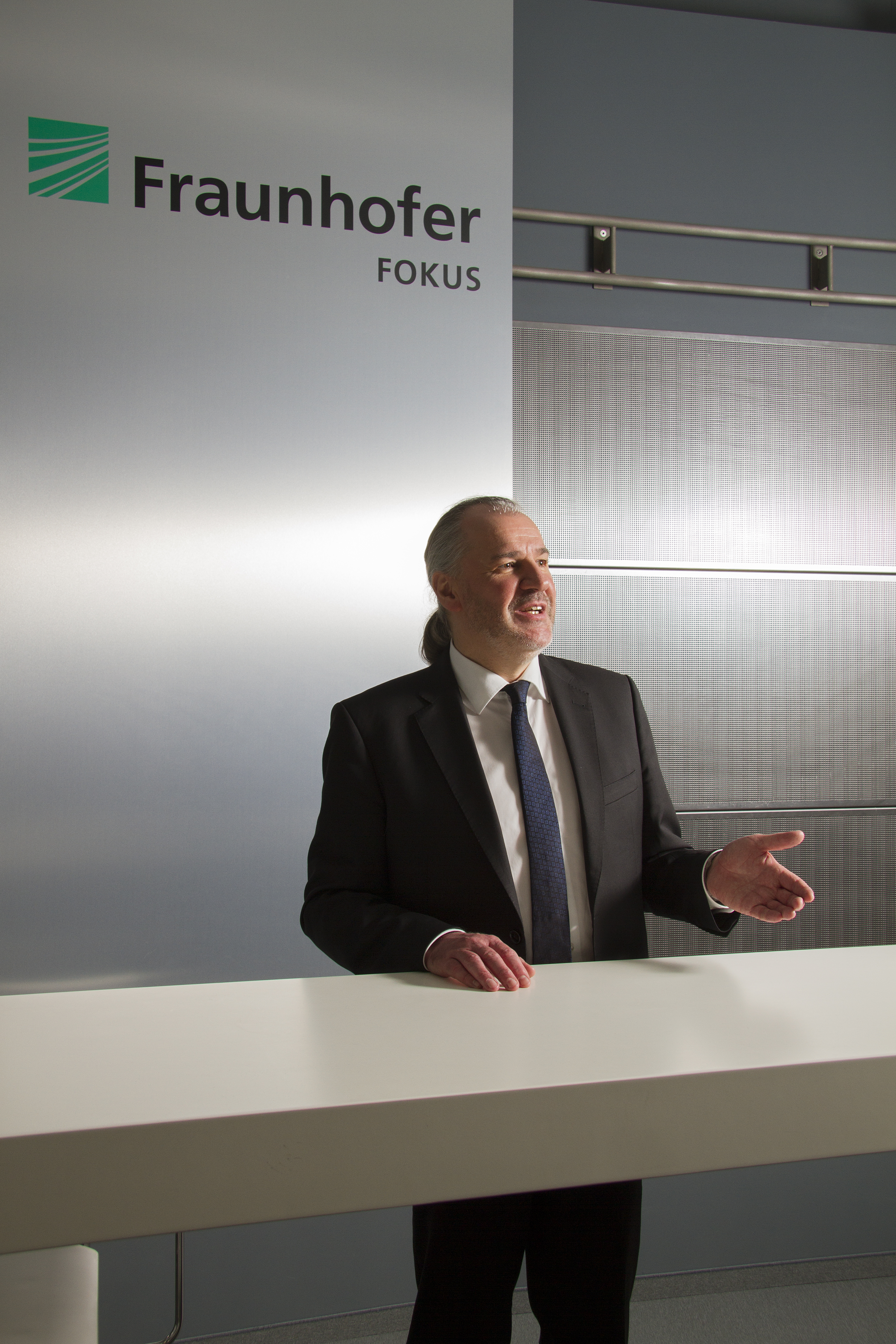
Prof. Hauswirth in 2018

FOKUS was founded in 1988 as a research establishment for Open Communication Systems and an institute of the former "Gesellschaft für Mathematik und Datenverarbeitung GmbH" (GMD, Society for Mathematics and Data Processing). Since the merger of GMD with Fraunhofer in July 2001, FOKUS has been an institute of the Fraunhofer Society. In 2012, the three ICT institutes FOKUS, FIRST and ISST Berlin were brought together under the name of Fraunhofer FOKUS.

In October 2014, Prof. Dr. Manfred Hauswirth was appointed Executive Director of the Fraunhofer FOKUS. Fraunhofer-Gesellschaft appointed Dr. Tom Ritter, a computer scientist, as deputy director and he commenced in November 2019.

== Main research areas ==
Fraunhofer FOKUS develops vendor-neutral solutions for ICT systems. The institute focusses on practice-oriented research and development of digital interconnectivity. Fraunhofer FOKUS cooperates with business enterprises and public administration to support digitisation through research. It also carries out research into some of the key challenges to social development and the smart cities of the future, such as access to information, the sustainable and efficient use of resources, networked mobility and a modern public administration system. Research activities focus on inter-operable, user-centred domain and inter-organizational solutions.

The Session Initiation Protocol (SIP), for example, which has become the standard for Voice over IP and Internet telephony, was originally developed at Fraunhofer FOKUS. Fraunhofer FOKUS also played a significant role in the introduction of the new ID card in Germany in 2010. Fraunhofer FOKUS has also developed and provided important solutions for the German and European ecosystem in the field of quantum computing—the higher-level programming language Qrisp (embedded DSL in Python) is one of the first programming languages worldwide to enable abstract, hardware-independent development of quantum algorithms.

== Business units ==
The success of the institute is based on an organization comprising different business units:

- ASCT designs and develops software and ICT systems for the automotive industry, with a particular emphasis on Car2X communication and 5G.
- ESPRI design and development of logistics information technologies for civil protection, disaster control and public safety and security.
- DPS Consulting, design and development of e-government solutions for politics, administration and business, together with the implementation of architectures and standards.
- FAME develops interactive web technologies, with an emphasis on cross-platform applications, smart media, IPTV and personalized entertainment.
- NGNI develops 5G testbeds, 5G core networks (Open5GCore practical implementation), data management, factory shop floor fixed and mobile communication
- SQC Methods, processes and tools for the development and quality assurance of software-intense systems that often perform business-critical or security- and safety-relevant functions in urban infrastructures.
- VISCOM real-time capable algorithms for the visualization, tracking, data fusion and interaction in intuitive assistance systems and user interfaces.

== Infrastructure ==
In 2024, FOKUS employed 494 people, including 178 students and interns. The Fraunhofer FOKUS budget in 2023 was €42.6 million; of which €28.5 million was spent on personnel, €13 million on equipment and materials and €1.1 million on investments.
