= Ray O. Johnson =

American businessman

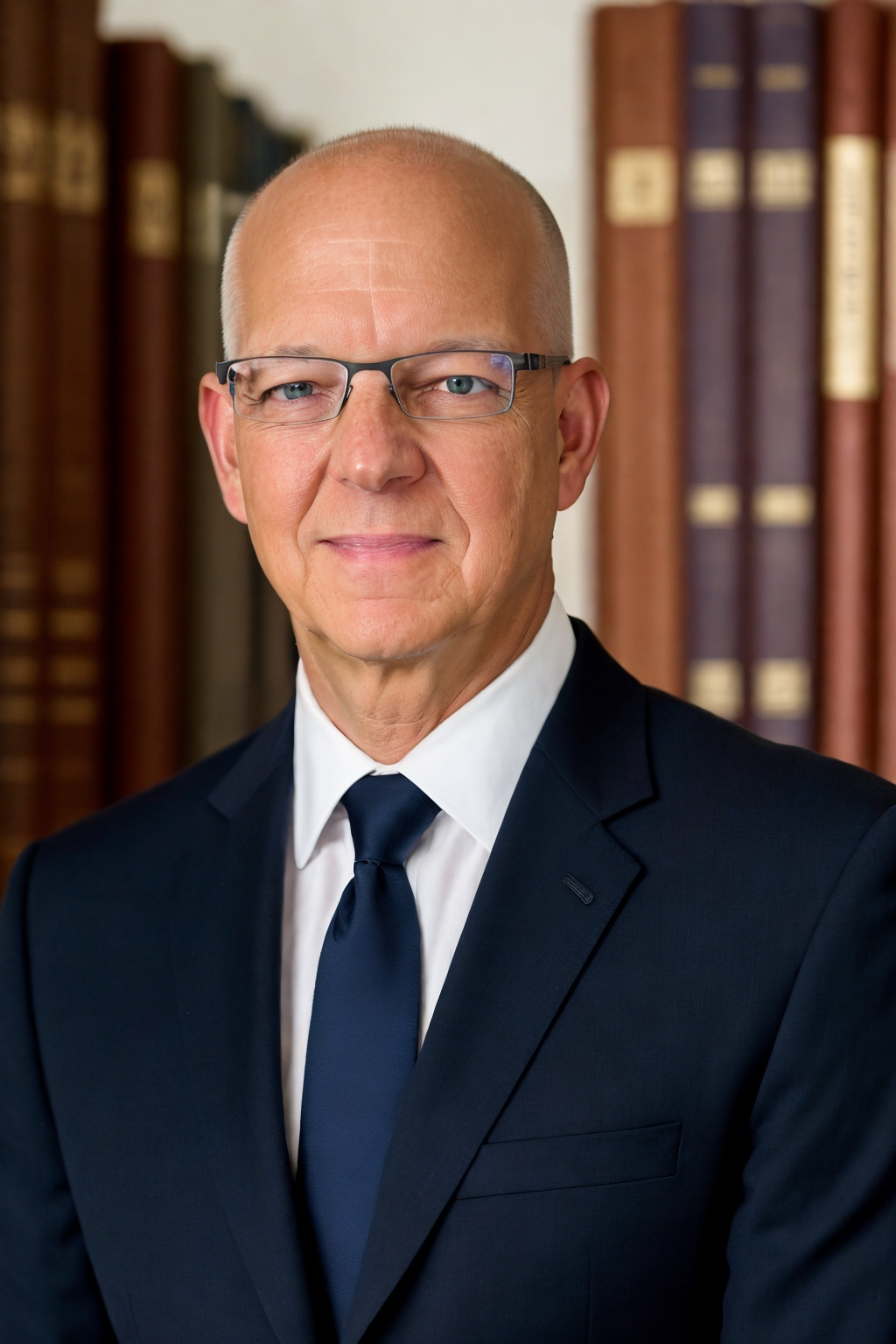
- Johnson in 2024
- Education: BS Electrical Engineering, Oklahoma State University; MS & Ph.D in Electrical Engineering, Air Force Institute of Technology
- Occupations: International executive focused on business, strategy, and innovation

Ray O. Johnson is an American business executive. Johnson is currently serving as Senior Advisor to the President of Khalifa University, providing expert counsel on complex strategic and operational matters. Johnson also serves as an operating partner at Bessemer Venture Partners, an American venture capital firm with over $20 billion under management and the oldest venture capital firm in the United States. He recently served as the chief executive officer of the Technology Innovation Institute and of ASPIRE, both based in Abu Dhabi, United Arab Emirates. Before that, he served as the Lockheed Martin Corporation's chief technology officer and corporate senior vice president for engineering, technology, and operations.

== Early life and education ==
Johnson was born in Kansas City, Missouri. He graduated from Oklahoma State University in 1984 with a Bachelor of Science degree in electrical engineering. In 2010, the College of Engineering, Architecture, and Technology presented him with a Hall of Fame award.

He went on to study at the Air Force Institute of Technology, where he earned a Master of Science in electrical engineering in 1987, and in 1993, he received a Ph.D. in electrical engineering. He received the Distinguished Alumni award from the Air Force Institute of Technology in 2010.

== Career ==
Johnson joined the U.S. Air Force in 1975. He served in several Major Commands including the Tactical Air Command, Electronic Security Command, Strategic Air Command, and Air Force Materiel Command. He retired from the Air Force in 1996.

Johnson has experience in a variety of executive positions, including the senior vice president and business unit general manager at SAIC, senior vice president and chief operating officer at Modern Technology Solutions, Inc, and corporate senior vice president for engineering, technology, and operations and chief technology officer of the Lockheed Martin Corporation. In this role, Johnson was responsible for more than 72,000 people and 4,000 programs.

== Other activities ==
Johnson is a Full Academician of the International Academy of Astronautics (IAA), a Fellow of the International Society for Optical Engineering (SPIE), the American Institute of Aeronautics and Astronautics (AIAA), and the Institute of Electrical and Electronics Engineers (IEEE), and a member of Eta Kappa Nu, Tau Beta Pi, and Phi Kappa Phi.

Johnson served on the Department of the Air Force's Scientific Advisory Board from 2001 to 2005. He was a member of the Sandia National Laboratories Board of Directors from 2007 to 2015, and a member of the Argonne National Laboratory Board of Governors from 2016 to 2021. Johnson was a member of the governing board of the Massachusetts Institute of Technology Energy Initiative. In 2014, Johnson received the Maurice Holland Award for the article "Tools for Managing Early-Stage Business Model Innovation," which he co-authored with Lockheed's VP of international engineering and technology, John D. Evans, and published in Research-Technology Management in late-2013.

From 2009 to 2014, Johnson attended the annual meetings of the World Economic Forum in Davos-Klosters, Switzerland. In 2009, he served on the New Frontiers of Conflict panel. In 2010, he served on the Rethinking the Global Commons: Space panel and the Space Security Council. He served on The Science Agenda session at the 2011 World Economic Forum Annual Meeting as the industry's representative.

For the 2012 World Economic Forum Annual Meeting, he was a member of the Davos Open Forum panel, A Day Without Satellites. In 2013, Johnson participated in four World Economic Forum Annual Meeting sessions: Manufacturing for Growth – Strategies for Driving Growth and Employment; Cyber Resilience, where he led a Critical Infrastructure Protection group; Hyperconnected World Cross-Industry CEO Session; and Future of Space session.
