= List of quantum computing journals =

List of academic journals related to quantum computing

This is a list of quantum computing journals which is a collection of peer-reviewed scientific journals that publish research in the field of quantum computing, including topics such as quantum algorithms, quantum information theory, quantum cryptography, and quantum hardware.

== Journals ==
- ACM Transactions on Quantum Computing
- Advanced Quantum Technologies
- IEEE Transactions on Quantum Engineering
- IET Quantum Communications
- International Journal of Quantum Information
- Quantum Engineering
- npj Quantum Information
- Quantum (journal)
- Quantum Information Processing
- Quantum Machine Intelligence

== See also ==
- List of computer science journals
- List of quantum computing books
- List of quantum software
- List of physics journals
- List of scientific journals
- List of cryptography journals
- List of computer science conferences
- Quantum information science
- Quantum Computation and Quantum Information — textbook
- Quantum engineering
- Quantum programming
- List of quantum algorithms
- Glossary of quantum computing
