= QC Ware =

Quantum computing company

- Industry: Quantum Computing
- Founded: 2014; 12 years ago in Palo Alto, California, U.S.
- Headquarters: Palo Alto, United States

QC Ware is a quantum-computing-as-a-service company based in Palo Alto, California.

== History ==
QC Ware was founded in 2014 by Matt Johnson, KJ Sham, and Randall Correll after Johnson met a group of researchers at NASA Ames interested in quantum computing.

In 2018, QC Ware was one of the first testers of Google's Cirq framework, publicly demonstrating an implementation of the QAOA algorithm on a simulator.

== Services ==
In 2019, QC Ware launched Forge, a cloud platform that aims to allow developers to run algorithms on hardware provided by multiple vendors. As of the launch, the platform offered access to a D-Wave quantum computer but only simulations of Google and IBM machines.

== Q2B conference ==
QC Ware hosts an annual practical quantum computing conference. The first Q2B was hosted in 2017.
