= Microsoft Ignite =

Annual conference for developers and IT professionals

Keynote at TechEd Europe 2007

Microsoft Ignite is an annual conference for developers, IT professionals and partners, hosted by Microsoft. The first conference, then known as TechEd, happened in 1993 in Orlando, Florida, United States.

After the TechEd conference held in Barcelona, 2014, Microsoft changed its conference schedule and introduced the name Microsoft Ignite starting in 2015. Thus marking the transition from the TechEd name to the current one.

The conference normally lasts between three and five days, and consists of presentation and whiteboard sessions and hands-on labs. It offers opportunities to meet Microsoft experts, MVPs and community members. Networking is enhanced through parties, community areas and "Ask the Expert" sessions. The event also includes an exhibition area where vendors can show off technologies and sell products. There is a vast content catalog from which attendees can select sessions that will be most beneficial. An agenda is published online before the conference begins. From 2024, Microsoft merged its partner event, Microsoft Inspire, with Microsoft Ignite to have one single event for both formats.

== Africa ==
Was previously known as TechEd South Africa until 2007, where it changed to TechEd Africa. 2007 was also the last year the event was hosted at Sun City, after which it was moved to the Durban International Conference Centre (ICC) due to the growing size of the audience, which was no longer able to be accommodated at Sun City.

== Australia ==
TechEd Australia is the largest TechEd in the Asia-Pacific region.

== Europe ==
Microsoft Ignite is an annual event in cities like Amsterdam.

== India ==
Microsoft TechEd India has been an annual fixture since 2003 except for 2008 which was the only year when Microsoft TechEd India event was not organized.

In 2006, TechEd was held in New Delhi, Pune, Mumbai, Chennai, Hyderabad and Bangalore during the month of June. There were two TechEd events held in each city, the first one delved into architectural aspects of technology and laid emphasis on the needs of the Architect audience alongside four tracks focused on Platform and Tools for Developers. The second event was geared towards technology professionals working on IT infrastructure.

In 2007, TechEd was held in Bangalore.

In 2009, TechEd was held in Hyderabad in the month of May. Rechristened Microsoft TechMela, the name change was necessitated by an urge to Indianize the event and its content so that it aligned with the ethos of every Indian. It was attended by over 2,500 CXOs, TDMs, BDMs, Developers, IT Professionals, Architects, Designers, faculty Members and Technology Students.

TechEd-India 2009 was keynoted by Steve Ballmer, the only TechEd event worldwide where Steve Ballmer was to speak. There were 28 Technical Tracks that spanned more than 112 breakout sessions, 24 instructor-led Labs, more than 20 Chalk-Talk sessions. The tracks were designed as a navigational tool which assisted in finding the sessions and labs best suited for individual needs.

In 2011, TechEd India was held in Bangalore from March 23–25 at Hotel Lalit Ashok. The event included keynotes by Senior Microsoft Executives, breakout sessions, hands-on-labs, instructor-led labs, product team tents, free Microsoft certification, community programs and solution expo. The event was keynoted by Qi Lu.

In 2012, 2013, and 2014, Tech Ed India was held in Bangalore at The LaLiT Hotels, Palaces and Resorts.

== Israel ==
TechEd conferences in Israel were held in Eilat. The first TechEd conference was held in 2001, with more than 1,000 participants. Six more conferences were held until 2010.

== Latin America ==
The Latin American TechEd has always been held in São Paulo, Brazil. However, there was also an edition of it in Mexico in 2001.

== Middle East ==
First started in 2010 and hosted in Dubai.

== New Zealand ==
TechEd New Zealand is the largest IT Conference in New Zealand and is held annually in Auckland.

== North America ==
Each year for the North American event changes to a new location. In 2024, Microsoft Ignite is returning to Chicago and will be held at the McCormick Place in Chicago, Illinois between November 18-22, 2024.

== TechEd Online ==
TechEd Online was an online supplement to the in-person events, which contained video interviews recorded at the event, videos of sessions and keynotes, blogs and speaker blog aggregation. Much of this content could first be found on Microsoft's Channel 9, but now is ordinarily available directly on the Ignite website itself.

For TechEd North America, video recordings, session slide decks, and supplemental content can be found on myTechEd.

== myTechEd ==
Microsoft myTechEd is an online community and social networking tool where conference attendees can participate in technical discussions, access recordings of past year's sessions, and connect with speakers and other attendees through a directory. myTechEd is a free resource available for both in-person attendees and virtual attendees who are not able to make it to the annual conference.

== Dates and Locations of TechEd Events ==
| Year | Africa | Australia | China | Europe EMEA | India | Japan | Latin America | New Zealand | Middle East | North America | Russia | South East Asia |
|---|---|---|---|---|---|---|---|---|---|---|---|---|
| 1993 | | | | | | | | | | March 9–12, Disney Swan/Dolphin Hotels, Orlando, FL | | |
| 1994 | | | | Apr 19-21, Bournemouth, UK | | | | | | Mar 28-31, New Orleans, LA | | |
| 1995 | | Sydney | | Apr 10-12, Hamburg, Germany | | | | | | Mar 27-31, New Orleans, LA | | |
| 1996 | | Brisbane | | June 11–14, Nice, France | | | | | | April 15–19, Los Angeles, CA | | |
| 1997 | | Melbourne | | July 1–4, Nice, France | | | | | | May 5–9, Orlando, FL | | |
| 1998 | | Sydney | | July 6–10, Nice, France | | | | | | June 1–5, New Orleans, LA | | |
| 1999 | | Brisbane | | July 5–9, Amsterdam, Netherlands | | | | | | May 21–28, Dallas Convention Centre | | |
| 2000 | | Cairns | | July 3–7, Amsterdam, Netherlands | | | | | | Jun 5-9, Orlando, FL | | Aug 21-25, Kuala Lumpur, Malaysia |
| 2001 | | Melbourne | | July 3–6, Barcelona, Spain | | | | | | Jun 17-21, Atlanta, GA | | |
| 2002 | | Brisbane | | Jul, 1-5, Barcelona, Spain | | | | | | Apr 9-13, New Orleans, LA | | |
| 2003 | | Brisbane | | Jun 30 - Jul 4, Barcelona, Spain | | | | | | Jun 1-6, Dallas, TX | | |
| 2004 | | Canberra | Sep 15 - 17, Shanghai | Jun 29 - Jul 2, Amsterdam, Netherlands | | | | | | May 23–28, San Diego, CA | | Kuala Lumpur, Malaysia |
| 2005 | Aug, Sun City, South Africa | Gold Coast | | Jul 5-8, Amsterdam, Netherlands | | | | | | Jun 5-10, Orlando, FL | | |
| 2006 | Oct 21-24, Sun City, South Africa | Sydney | | Nov 7-10/14-17, Barcelona, Spain | | | | | | Jun 11-16, Boston, MA | | |
| 2007 | Oct, Sun City, South Africa | Gold Coast | | Nov 5-9/12-16, Barcelona, Spain | | | | | | Jun 3-8, Orlando, FL | | Sep 10-13, Kuala Lumpur, Malaysia |
| 2008 | Aug 03-05, ICC, Durban, South Africa | Sydney | | Nov 10-14, Barcelona, Spain | | | | | | Jun 2-6/9-13, Orlando, FL | | Aug 11-14, Kuala Lumpur, Malaysia |
| 2009 | Aug 02-05, ICC, Durban, South Africa | Sep 08-11, Gold Coast | Nov, Beijing, China | Oct 27-29, Vienna, Austria | May 13–15, Hyderabad | Aug 25-28, Yokohama | | Sep 14-16, Auckland | | May 11–15, Los Angeles, CA | | Kuala Lumpur, Malaysia |
| 2010 | Oct 17-20, ICC, Durban, South Africa | Aug 24-27, Gold Coast | | Nov 8-12, Berlin, Germany | April 12–14, Bangalore | | Sep 13-15, São Paulo, Brazil | Aug 30 - Sep 1, Auckland | Mar 1-3, Dubai International Convention Centre, Dubai, UAE | Jun 7-10, New Orleans, LA | | |
| 2011 | | Aug 30 - Sep 2, Gold Coast | | Nov 8-10, Madrid, Spain | Mar 23-25, Bangalore | | | August 24–26, Auckland | | May 16–19, Atlanta, GA | Nov 9-10, Krasnogorsk | |
| 2012 | | Sep 11-14, Gold Coast | Dec 4-6, Beijing | June 26–29, Amsterdam, Netherlands | Mar 21-23, Bangalore | | | September 4–7, Auckland | | Jun 11-14, Orlando, FL | | |
| 2013 | April 16–19, Durban, South Africa | Sep 3-6, Gold Coast | | June 25–28, Madrid, Spain | Bengaluru, March 18–19, 2013; Pune, March 25–26, 2013 | | | September 10–13, Auckland | | June 3–6, New Orleans, LA | | |
| 2014 | | | | October 27–31, Barcelona, Spain | | | | September 9–12, Auckland | | May 12–15, Houston, TX | | |

== Dates and Locations of Ignite Events ==
Gathered from event page and announcements from the event Twitter feed.

| Year | North America | Tour | Notes |
|---|---|---|---|
| 2015 | May 4–8, Chicago, IL | | |
| 2016 | September 26–30, Atlanta, GA | | 2016 was announced to be in Chicago for 2nd year in a row but was then canceled and subsequently rescheduled for Atlanta. |
| 2017 | September 25–29, Orlando, FL | | |
| 2018 | September 24–28, Orlando, FL | | |
| 2019 | November 4–8, Orlando, FL | 17 cities around the world | |
| 2020 | September 22–24, Digital Event | | Originally planned for New Orleans, LA |
| 2021 | March 2–4, Digital Event | | |
| 2021 | November 1–5, Digital Event | | |
| 2022 | October 12-14, Digital & In-Person | Various cities around the world | Combination of in-person event in Seattle and digital/online participation. |
| 2023 | In Seattle: November 14–17; Online dates: November 15–16 | | Combination of in-person event, again in Seattle, and digital/online participation. This will be the first Microsoft event at the new Summit building at the Seattle Convention Center. |
| 2024 | November 18-22, Chicago | | |
| 2025 | November 18-21, Digital & In-Person | optional pre-day November 17 | The In-Person event will take place in the Moscone Center in San Francisco |
