= Xanadu Quantum Technologies =

Quantum computing company based in Toronto, Canada

- Type: Public
- Traded as: TSX: XNDU; Nasdaq: XNDU
- Industry: Quantum Computing
- Founded: 2016
- Founder: Christian Weedbrook, CEO
- Headquarters: Toronto, Canada
- Website: xanadu.ai

Xanadu Quantum Technologies is a Canadian quantum computing hardware and software company headquartered in Toronto, Ontario. The company develops cloud accessible photonic quantum computers and develops open-source software for quantum machine learning and simulating quantum photonic devices.

== History ==
Xanadu was founded in 2016 by Christian Weedbrook and was a participant in the Creative Destruction Lab's accelerator program. Since then, Xanadu has raised a total of US$245M in funding with venture capital financing from Bessemer Venture Partners, Capricorn Investment Group, Tiger Global Management, In-Q-Tel, Business Development Bank of Canada, OMERS Ventures, Georgian, Real Ventures, Golden Ventures and Radical Ventures and innovation grants from Sustainable Development Technology Canada and DARPA.

== Technology ==
Xanadu's hardware efforts have focused on developing programmable Gaussian boson sampling (GBS) devices. GBS is a generalization of boson sampling, which traditionally uses single photons as input; GBS instead employs squeezed states of light. In 2020, Xanadu published a blueprint for building a fault-tolerant quantum computer using photonic technology.

In June 2022, Xanadu reported a boson sampling experiment comparable to those of Google and the University of Science and Technology of China. Their setup used loops of optical fiber and multiplexing to replace a network of beam splitters with a single one, which also made the system more reconfigurable. They detected 125 to 219 photons from 216 squeezed modes and claimed a 50 million-fold speedup over previous experiments.

In January 2025, Xanadu advanced photonic quantum computing by demonstrating a scalable modular approach to networking photonic quantum computers. This work, published in Nature, introduced architectural improvements for integrating multiple photonic quantum processors, significantly enhancing error correction and scalability.
