= Q Sharp =

Programming language for quantum algorithms

Q#
- Paradigm: Quantum, functional, imperative
- Designed by: Microsoft Research (quantum architectures and computation group; QuArC)
- Developer: Microsoft
- First appeared: December 11, 2017
- Typing discipline: Static, strong
- Platform: Common Language Infrastructure
- License: MIT License
- Filename extensions: .qs
- Website: learn.microsoft.com/en-us/azure/quantum/

Influenced by
- C#, F#, Python

Q# (pronounced Q sharp) is a domain-specific programming language used for expressing quantum algorithms. It was initially released to the public by Microsoft as part of the Quantum Development Kit.

Q# works in conjunction with classical languages such as C#, Python and F#, and is designed to allow the use of traditional programming concepts in quantum computing, including functions with variables and branches as well as a syntax-highlighted development environment with a quantum debugger.

== History ==
Historically, Microsoft Research had two teams interested in quantum computing: the QuArC team based in Redmond, Washington, directed by Krysta Svore, that explored the construction of quantum circuitry, and Station Q initially located in Santa Barbara and directed by Michael Freedman, that explored topological quantum computing.

During a Microsoft Ignite Keynote on September 26, 2017, Microsoft announced that they were going to release a new programming language geared specifically towards quantum computers. On December 11, 2017, Microsoft released Q# as a part of the Quantum Development Kit.

At Build 2019, Microsoft announced that it would be open-sourcing the Quantum Development Kit, including its Q# compilers and simulators.

To support Q#, Microsoft developed Quantum Intermediate Representation (QIR) in 2023 as a common interface between programming languages and target quantum processors. The company also announced a compiler extension that generates QIR from Q#.

Bettina Heim used to lead the Q# language development effort.

== Usage ==
Q# is available as a separately downloaded extension for Visual Studio, but it can also be run as an independent tool from the command line or Visual Studio Code. Q# was introduced on Windows and is available on MacOS and Linux.

The Quantum Development Kit includes a quantum simulator capable of running Q# and simulated 30 logical qubits.

In order to invoke the quantum simulator, another .NET programming language, usually C#, is used, which provides the (classical) input data for the simulator and reads the (classical) output data from the simulator.

== Features ==
A primary feature of Q# is the ability to create and use qubits for algorithms. As a consequence, some of the most prominent features of Q# are the ability to entangle and introduce superpositioning to qubits via controlled NOT gates and Hadamard gates, respectively, as well as Toffoli Gates, Pauli X, Y, Z Gate, and many more which are used for a variety of operations (See quantum logic gates).

The hardware stack that will eventually come together with Q# is expected to implement Qubits as topological qubits. The quantum simulator that is shipped with the Quantum Development Kit today is capable of processing up to 32 qubits on a user machine and up to 40 qubits on Azure.

== Documentation and resources ==
Currently, the resources available for Q# are scarce, but the official documentation is published: Microsoft Developer Network: Q#. Microsoft Quantum Github repository is also a large collection of sample programs implementing a variety of Quantum algorithms and their tests.

Microsoft has also hosted a Quantum Coding contest on Codeforces, called Microsoft Q# Coding Contest - Codeforces, and also provided related material to help answer the questions in the blog posts, plus the detailed solutions in the tutorials.

Microsoft hosts a set of learning exercises to help learn Q# on GitHub: microsoft/QuantumKatas with links to resources, and answers to the problems.

== Syntax ==
Q# is syntactically related to both C# and F# yet also has some significant differences.

=== Similarities with C# ===
- Uses namespace for code isolation
- All statements end with a ;
- Curly braces are used for statements of scope
- Single line comments are done using //
- Variable data types such as Int Double String and Bool are similar, although capitalised (and Int is 64-bit)
- Qubits are allocated and disposed inside a using block.
- Lambda functions are defined using the => operator.
- Results are returned using the return keyword.

=== Similarities with F# ===
- Variables are declared using either let or mutable
- First-order functions
- Modules, which are imported using the open keyword
- The datatype is declared after the variable name
- The range operator ..
- for … in loops
- Every operation/function has a return value, rather than void. Instead of void, an empty Tuple () is returned.
- Definition of record datatypes (using the newtype keyword, instead of type).

=== Differences ===
- Functions are declared using the function keyword
- Operations on the quantum computer are declared using the operation keyword
- Lack of multiline comments
- Asserts instead of throwing exceptions
- Documentation is written in Markdown instead of XML-based documentation tags

== Example ==
The following source code is a multiplexer from the official Microsoft Q# library repository.

// Copyright (c) Microsoft Corporation.
// Licensed under the MIT License.

namespace Microsoft.Quantum.Canon {
    open Microsoft.Quantum.Intrinsic;
    open Microsoft.Quantum.Arithmetic;
    open Microsoft.Quantum.Arrays;
    open Microsoft.Quantum.Diagnostics;
    open Microsoft.Quantum.Math;

    /// # Summary
    /// Applies a multiply-controlled unitary operation $U$ that applies a
    /// unitary $V_j$ when controlled by n-qubit number state $\ket{j}$.
    ///
    /// $U = \sum^{N-1}_{j=0}\ket{j}\bra{j}\otimes V_j$.
    ///
    /// # Input
    /// ## unitaryGenerator
    /// A tuple where the first element `Int` is the number of unitaries $N$,
    /// and the second element `(Int -> ('T => () is Adj + Ctl))`
    /// is a function that takes an integer $j$ in $[0,N-1]$ and outputs the unitary
    /// operation $V_j$.
    ///
    /// ## index
    /// $n$-qubit control register that encodes number states $\ket{j}$ in
    /// little-endian format.
    ///
    /// ## target
    /// Generic qubit register that $V_j$ acts on.
    ///
    /// # Remarks
    /// `coefficients` will be padded with identity elements if
    /// fewer than $2^n$ are specified. This implementation uses
    /// $n-1$ auxiliary qubits.
    ///
    /// # References
    /// - [ *Andrew M. Childs, Dmitri Maslov, Yunseong Nam, Neil J. Ross, Yuan Su*,
    ///      arXiv:1711.10980](https://arxiv.org/abs/1711.10980)
    operation MultiplexOperationsFromGenerator<'T>(unitaryGenerator : (Int, (Int -> ('T => Unit is Adj + Ctl))), index: LittleEndian, target: 'T) : Unit is Ctl + Adj {
        let (nUnitaries, unitaryFunction) = unitaryGenerator;
        let unitaryGeneratorWithOffset = (nUnitaries, 0, unitaryFunction);
        if Length(index!) == 0 {
            fail "MultiplexOperations failed. Number of index qubits must be greater than 0.";
        }
        if nUnitaries > 0 {
            let auxiliary = [];
            Adjoint MultiplexOperationsFromGeneratorImpl(unitaryGeneratorWithOffset, auxiliary, index, target);
        }
    }

    /// # Summary
    /// Implementation step of `MultiplexOperationsFromGenerator`.
    /// # See Also
    /// - Microsoft.Quantum.Canon.MultiplexOperationsFromGenerator
    internal operation MultiplexOperationsFromGeneratorImpl<'T>(unitaryGenerator : (Int, Int, (Int -> ('T => Unit is Adj + Ctl))), auxiliary: Qubit[], index: LittleEndian, target: 'T)
    : Unit {
        body (...) {
            let nIndex = Length(index!);
            let nStates = 2^nIndex;

            let (nUnitaries, unitaryOffset, unitaryFunction) = unitaryGenerator;

            let nUnitariesLeft = MinI(nUnitaries, nStates / 2);
            let nUnitariesRight = MinI(nUnitaries, nStates);

            let leftUnitaries = (nUnitariesLeft, unitaryOffset, unitaryFunction);
            let rightUnitaries = (nUnitariesRight - nUnitariesLeft, unitaryOffset + nUnitariesLeft, unitaryFunction);

            let newControls = LittleEndian(Most(index!));

            if nUnitaries > 0 {
                if Length(auxiliary) == 1 and nIndex == 0 {
                    // Termination case

                    (Controlled Adjoint (unitaryFunction(unitaryOffset)))(auxiliary, target);
                } elif Length(auxiliary) == 0 and nIndex >= 1 {
                    // Start case
                    let newauxiliary = Tail(index!);
                    if nUnitariesRight > 0 {
                        MultiplexOperationsFromGeneratorImpl(rightUnitaries, [newauxiliary], newControls, target);
                    }
                    within {
                        X(newauxiliary);
                    } apply {
                        MultiplexOperationsFromGeneratorImpl(leftUnitaries, [newauxiliary], newControls, target);
                    }
                } else {
                    // Recursion that reduces nIndex by 1 and sets Length(auxiliary) to 1.
                    let controls = [Tail(index!)] + auxiliary;
                    use newauxiliary = Qubit();
                    use andauxiliary = Qubit[MaxI(0, Length(controls) - 2)];
                    within {
                        ApplyAndChain(andauxiliary, controls, newauxiliary);
                    } apply {
                        if nUnitariesRight > 0 {
                            MultiplexOperationsFromGeneratorImpl(rightUnitaries, [newauxiliary], newControls, target);
                        }
                        within {
                            (Controlled X)(auxiliary, newauxiliary);
                        } apply {
                            MultiplexOperationsFromGeneratorImpl(leftUnitaries, [newauxiliary], newControls, target);
                        }
                    }
                }
            }
        }
        adjoint auto;
        controlled (controlRegister, ...) {
            MultiplexOperationsFromGeneratorImpl(unitaryGenerator, auxiliary + controlRegister, index, target);
        }
        adjoint controlled auto;
    }

    /// # Summary
    /// Applies multiply-controlled unitary operation $U$ that applies a
    /// unitary $V_j$ when controlled by n-qubit number state $\ket{j}$.
    ///
    /// $U = \sum^{N-1}_{j=0}\ket{j}\bra{j}\otimes V_j$.
    ///
    /// # Input
    /// ## unitaryGenerator
    /// A tuple where the first element `Int` is the number of unitaries $N$,
    /// and the second element `(Int -> ('T => () is Adj + Ctl))`
    /// is a function that takes an integer $j$ in $[0,N-1]$ and outputs the unitary
    /// operation $V_j$.
    ///
    /// ## index
    /// $n$-qubit control register that encodes number states $\ket{j}$ in
    /// little-endian format.
    ///
    /// ## target
    /// Generic qubit register that $V_j$ acts on.
    ///
    /// # Remarks
    /// `coefficients` will be padded with identity elements if
    /// fewer than $2^n$ are specified. This version is implemented
    /// directly by looping through n-controlled unitary operators.
    operation MultiplexOperationsBruteForceFromGenerator<'T>(unitaryGenerator : (Int, (Int -> ('T => Unit is Adj + Ctl))), index: LittleEndian, target: 'T)
    : Unit is Adj + Ctl {
        let nIndex = Length(index!);
        let nStates = 2^nIndex;
        let (nUnitaries, unitaryFunction) = unitaryGenerator;
        for idxOp in 0..MinI(nStates,nUnitaries) - 1 {
            (ControlledOnInt(idxOp, unitaryFunction(idxOp)))(index!, target);
        }
    }

    /// # Summary
    /// Returns a multiply-controlled unitary operation $U$ that applies a
    /// unitary $V_j$ when controlled by n-qubit number state $\ket{j}$.
    ///
    /// $U = \sum^{2^n-1}_{j=0}\ket{j}\bra{j}\otimes V_j$.
    ///
    /// # Input
    /// ## unitaryGenerator
    /// A tuple where the first element `Int` is the number of unitaries $N$,
    /// and the second element `(Int -> ('T => () is Adj + Ctl))`
    /// is a function that takes an integer $j$ in $[0,N-1]$ and outputs the unitary
    /// operation $V_j$.
    ///
    /// # Output
    /// A multiply-controlled unitary operation $U$ that applies unitaries
    /// described by `unitaryGenerator`.
    ///
    /// # See Also
    /// - Microsoft.Quantum.Canon.MultiplexOperationsFromGenerator
    function MultiplexerFromGenerator(unitaryGenerator : (Int, (Int -> (Qubit[] => Unit is Adj + Ctl)))) : ((LittleEndian, Qubit[]) => Unit is Adj + Ctl) {
        return MultiplexOperationsFromGenerator(unitaryGenerator, _, _);
    }

    /// # Summary
    /// Returns a multiply-controlled unitary operation $U$ that applies a
    /// unitary $V_j$ when controlled by n-qubit number state $\ket{j}$.
    ///
    /// $U = \sum^{2^n-1}_{j=0}\ket{j}\bra{j}\otimes V_j$.
    ///
    /// # Input
    /// ## unitaryGenerator
    /// A tuple where the first element `Int` is the number of unitaries $N$,
    /// and the second element `(Int -> ('T => () is Adj + Ctl))`
    /// is a function that takes an integer $j$ in $[0,N-1]$ and outputs the unitary
    /// operation $V_j$.
    ///
    /// # Output
    /// A multiply-controlled unitary operation $U$ that applies unitaries
    /// described by `unitaryGenerator`.
    ///
    /// # See Also
    /// - Microsoft.Quantum.Canon.MultiplexOperationsBruteForceFromGenerator
    function MultiplexerBruteForceFromGenerator(unitaryGenerator : (Int, (Int -> (Qubit[] => Unit is Adj + Ctl)))) : ((LittleEndian, Qubit[]) => Unit is Adj + Ctl) {
        return MultiplexOperationsBruteForceFromGenerator(unitaryGenerator, _, _);
    }

    /// # Summary
    /// Computes a chain of AND gates
    ///
    /// # Description
    /// The auxiliary qubits to compute temporary results must be specified explicitly.
    /// The length of that register is `Length(ctrlRegister) - 2`, if there are at least
    /// two controls, otherwise the length is 0.
    internal operation ApplyAndChain(auxRegister : Qubit[], ctrlRegister : Qubit[], target : Qubit)
    : Unit is Adj {
        if Length(ctrlRegister) == 0 {
            X(target);
        } elif Length(ctrlRegister) == 1 {
            CNOT(Head(ctrlRegister), target);
        } else {
            EqualityFactI(Length(auxRegister), Length(ctrlRegister));
            let controls1 = ctrlRegister[0..0] + auxRegister;
            let controls2 = Rest(ctrlRegister);
            let targets = auxRegister + [target];
            ApplyToEachA(ApplyAnd, Zipped3(controls1, controls2, targets));
        }
    }
}
