= Qiskit =

Open-source software development kit

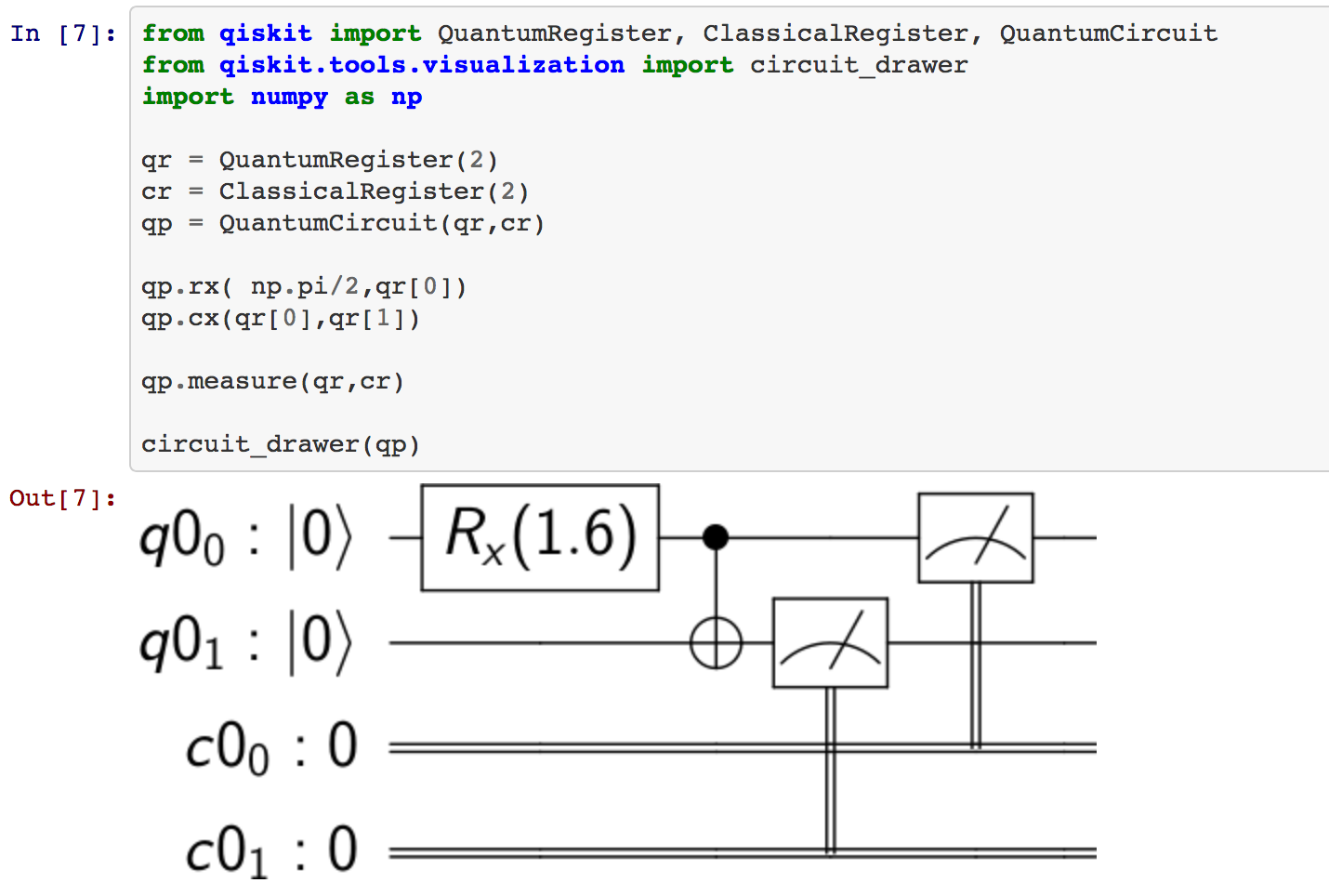
- Developers: IBM Research, Qiskit community
- Release: March 7, 2017; 9 years ago.
- Stable release: 2.6.1 / 22 October 2026; 7 days ago
- Written in: Rust, Python
- Operating system: Linux, MacOS, Windows
- Platform: x86_64, Arm, ppc64le, s390x
- Type: SDK for Quantum Computing
- License: Apache License 2.0
- Website: qiskit.org
- Repository: github.com/Qiskit/qiskit

Qiskit (Quantum Information Software Kit) is an open-source, Python-based, high-performance software stack for quantum computing, originally developed by IBM Research and first released in 2017. It provides tools for creating quantum programs (by defining quantum circuits and operations) and executing them on quantum computers or classical simulators. The name "Qiskit" refers broadly to a collection of quantum software tools. It is centered around the core Qiskit SDK, and combined with a suite of tools and services for quantum computation, like the Qiskit Runtime service that enables optimized computations through the cloud. Qiskit allows users to write quantum circuits and execute them on real quantum processors (such as superconducting qubit systems) or on various other compatible quantum devices. Over time, Qiskit’s capabilities have expanded with new components and improvements, such as Qiskit Functions and Qiskit addons, while maintaining an open-source ecosystem for quantum computing research and application development.

== Components ==
=== Qiskit SDK ===
The Qiskit SDK is the core software development kit for working with quantum computers at the level of extended (static, dynamic, and scheduled) quantum circuits, operators, and primitives. Qiskit SDK is an open‑source framework that allows users to construct quantum circuits, manipulate quantum operators, and interface with quantum hardware or simulators. The Qiskit SDK is the foundational component of the Qiskit software stack – it provides the largest set of features and acts as the base upon which other Qiskit services and modules are built. The core of Qiskit is written in the Rust (programming language) and provides APIs in C (programming language) and Python (programming language). The SDK is distributed as the Python package qiskit, in addition to supporting building Qiskit as a standalone shared library: libqiskit.

Key features of the Qiskit SDK include modules for building quantum circuits and registering quantum operations, a library of predefined quantum logic gates and parameterized circuits, a quantum information module for working with quantum states and operators, and a transpiler that optimizes and converts circuits to run on specific quantum hardware backends. For example, Qiskit allows users to create quantum circuits using an intuitive Python API, then employ the transpiler to adapt and optimize these circuits for a given device’s topology and constraints (reducing gate counts or circuit depth as needed). The SDK also provides tools for noise modeling and supports primitives – basic quantum program components (such as samplers and estimators for circuit outcomes) – which serve as building blocks for higher‑level quantum algorithms and can be executed using local simulators or cloud services. Together, these features make the Qiskit SDK a comprehensive platform for developing quantum algorithms and experiments in a hardware‑agnostic manner.

=== IBM Quantum Compute Service ===
IBM Quantum Compute Service is a cloud-based quantum execution service introduced by IBM to streamline running quantum computations on IBM Quantum systems. It allows users to run quantum programs with additional server-side management, improving performance by minimizing the latency of classical-quantum communication and leveraging advanced quantum error mitigation techniques.

IBM Quantum Compute Service provides an optimized cloud environment for submitting quantum workloads to the Qiskit Runtime, the execution environment running on IBM quantum systems. The Qiskit Runtime executes quantum circuits (or higher-level primitive programs) close to the quantum hardware, reducing latency and enabling more complex workflows than the traditional request-response method of job submission. This execution environment is designed to make quantum program execution more efficient and scalable, especially for algorithms that involve repeated circuit evaluations or iterative processes.

The Qiskit Runtime utilizes additional classical and quantum computing resources to incorporate error-mitigation strategies that increase the quality and accuracy of the results obtained from quantum processors. For example, it can automatically apply techniques such as dynamical decoupling (to suppress noise during circuit execution), zero-noise extrapolation, and other forms of readout error mitigation (to reduce the effect of measurement errors), aiming to return higher-quality outcomes from noisy quantum hardware.

IBM Quantum Compute Service supports multiple execution modes for running quantum jobs, each suited to different use cases. Users can execute a single job (a one-off circuit or primitive call with a specified number of shots), create a session to run a series of jobs interactively with lower overhead between them, or submit jobs in batch mode for parallel execution in the queue. These modes provide flexibility in managing experiments. For example, session mode enables iterative algorithms that adapt based on intermediate results, while batch mode is useful for running many independent circuits simultaneously.

=== Qiskit Serverless ===
Qiskit Serverless is an extension of the Qiskit ecosystem that enables running quantum–classical workloads in a distributed, cloud-native fashion. It provides a simple interface to manage compute resources and execute portions of a quantum workflow on remote servers, effectively allowing users to deploy quantum programs and their accompanying classical processing steps to the IBM Quantum cloud or even across multiple cloud environments. The goal of Qiskit Serverless is to facilitate utility-scale quantum applications by handling the allocation of both quantum processing units and classical computing resources as needed, which is especially useful for hybrid algorithms and large‑scale experiments. Qiskit Serverless can be used to:

- Parallelize classical tasks that are part of a quantum workflow, such as pre‑processing of input data or post‑processing of quantum results. By distributing these classical computations to cloud resources, users can speed up overall execution when working with many circuits or large datasets in tandem with quantum hardware.
- Persist long-running workloads in the cloud, allowing quantum jobs to continue executing and collecting results even if the user’s local environment (e.g., a laptop) is offline. This means a researcher can start a complex quantum experiment and not worry about maintaining a constant connection; the serverless system will handle the execution and retain the results until the user retrieves them.
- Deploy reusable programs (quantum applications or algorithmic routines) on the IBM Quantum Platform to invoke as needed. This turns custom quantum algorithms into services, enabling collaboration and reuse: for example, an optimization algorithm or a chemistry simulation routine could be uploaded once and then repeatedly executed with different parameters on demand.

By abstracting away the details of managing cloud resources, Qiskit Serverless aims to make it easier to scale up quantum experiments and integrate them into larger computing workflows.

=== Qiskit Add-ons ===
Qiskit Add-ons (stylized Qiskit addons) are modular, separately‑installed tools designed to extend Qiskit’s capabilities for quantum algorithm development. They build on Qiskit’s core framework and can be plugged into the user’s workflow to help scale or design new algorithms. Each add‑on is distributed as an independent Python package (for example, qiskit-addon-sqd for the SQD tool) that can be installed via the Python Package Index (PyPI) and then used alongside Qiskit’s SDK. These official add-ons enhance tasks like circuit mapping, optimization, and result post‑processing while integrating seamlessly with Qiskit’s functionalities.

- Approximate Quantum Compilation (AQC) – qiskit-addon-aqc-tensor. AQC uses tensor‑network methods to compress a segment of a quantum circuit into a shorter equivalent circuit with high fidelity.
- Multi‑Product Formulas (MPF) – qiskit-addon-mpf. MPF reduces Trotter error in Hamiltonian simulations by combining the results of multiple circuit executions in a weighted formula.
- Operator Backpropagation (OBP) – qiskit-addon-obp. OBP shortens circuit depth by trimming off the final set of gate operations and compensating through additional measurements on the remaining circuit.
- Sample‑based Quantum Diagonalization (SQD) – qiskit-addon-sqd. SQD is a post‑processing tool that classically analyzes bitstring samples from quantum circuit runs to estimate eigenvalues and eigenvectors of large operators (such as molecular Hamiltonians) more accurately under noise.

Each of these add-ons is maintained as an open-source extension in the GitHub Qiskit organization, with documentation and tutorials provided by IBM Quantum. This modular approach allows researchers to opt into advanced algorithmic techniques as needed, keeping Qiskit’s core lightweight while still enabling cutting-edge features through add-ons.

=== Qiskit Ecosystem ===
The Qiskit ecosystem refers to the broader collection of open-source projects that interface with Qiskit without being part of its core SDK. These projects, developed by IBM Quantum or the wider community, provide additional functionality and specialized tools that complement the Qiskit framework. By designing Qiskit with a modular and extensible architecture, IBM has enabled external packages to integrate easily and extend its capabilities in areas like simulation, job management, and error mitigation. This ecosystem enhances the usability of Qiskit by addressing tasks that lie beyond the scope of the base library, allowing users to tailor their quantum computing workflows with community‑driven solutions. Some notable projects in the Qiskit ecosystem include:

- Qiskit Aer (qiskit-aer) – A high‑performance simulator for quantum circuits, featuring multiple simulation backends and support for realistic noise models. It is maintained by IBM Quantum as the official simulation engine for Qiskit and is frequently used to validate algorithms before running on actual quantum processors.
- qBraid SDK (qbraid) – A platform‑agnostic quantum runtime and cloud management framework that streamlines the full lifecycle of quantum jobs. Developed and maintained by the company qBraid, this tool abstracts away much of the complexity in managing quantum computing workloads across different providers, complementing Qiskit’s development tools with cloud deployment capabilities.
- mthree (mthree) – A library for Matrix‑free Measurement Mitigation (M3) that improves the accuracy of qubit measurement outcomes on real hardware. This IBM Quantum‑developed package tackles readout errors by constructing a reduced model of the noise in the measurement process and then solving for corrected outcome probabilities without needing to invert large calibration matrices.

Through such ecosystem projects, Qiskit users can access extended functionality that is not included in the core SDK, thereby enhancing research and application development. For example, Aer enables thorough testing of algorithms in simulation, qBraid facilitates running Qiskit programs on diverse cloud hardware, and mthree helps in obtaining more accurate experimental data. A comprehensive catalog of Qiskit ecosystem projects is available on the Qiskit Ecosystem page, where users can discover other tools and libraries (and even contribute their own) that work in conjunction with Qiskit. All these ecosystem efforts contribute to a more versatile and robust quantum computing toolkit centered around Qiskit.

== See also ==
- IBM Quantum documentation
- IBM Qiskit ecosystem page
- Quantum Computing with Qiskit
- Quantum programming
