= Rigetti Computing =

American quantum computing company

Rigetti Computing, Inc.
- Type: Public
- Traded as: Nasdaq: RGTI
- Industry: Quantum computing
- Founded: 2013; 13 years ago
- Founder: Chad Rigetti
- Headquarters: Berkeley, California, United States
- Key people: Subodh Kulkarni (CEO)
- Products: Quantum integrated circuits Forest quantum computing software
- Revenue: ▼US$10.8 million (2024)
- Operating income: ▲US$−69 million (2024)
- Net income: ▼US$−201 million (2024)
- Total assets: ▲US$285 million (2024)
- Total equity: ▲US$127 million (2024)
- Number of employees: 140 (2025)
- Website: rigetti.com

Rigetti Computing, Inc. is an American developer of superconducting quantum integrated circuits used for quantum computers. Rigetti, which is based in Berkeley, California, also develops a cloud platform called Forest that enables programmers to execute quantum algorithms.

== History ==
Rigetti Computing was founded in 2013 by Chad Rigetti, a physicist with a background in quantum computers from IBM who studied under Michel Devoret. Chad Rigetti has authored more than 140 publications in the fields of quantum mechanics and quantum computing. Rigetti Computing received funding from startup incubator Y Combinator in 2014 as a so-called "spaceshot" company. Later that year, Rigetti also participated in The Alchemist Accelerator, a venture capital programme.

By February 2016, Rigetti created its first quantum processor, a three-qubit chip made using aluminum circuits on a silicon wafer. That same year, Rigetti raised Series A funding of US$24 million in a round led by Andreessen Horowitz. In November, the company secured Series B funding of $40 million in a round led by investment firm Vy Capital, along with additional funding from Andreessen Horowitz and other investors. Y Combinator also participated in both rounds.

By Spring of 2017, Rigetti had advanced to testing eight-qubit quantum computers. In June, the company announced the release of Forest 1.0, a quantum computing platform designed to enable developers to create quantum algorithms. This was a major milestone.

In October 2021, Rigetti announced plans to go public via a SPAC merger, with estimated valuation of around US$1.5 billion. This deal was expected to raise an additional US$458 million, bringing the total funding to US$658 million. The fund will be used to accelerate the company's growth, including scaling its quantum processors from 80 qubits to 1,000 qubits by 2024, and to 4,000 by 2026. The SPAC deal closed on 2 March 2022, and Rigetti began trading on the NASDAQ under the ticker symbol RGTI.

In December 2022, Subodh Kulkarni became president and CEO of the company.

In July 2023 Rigetti launched a single-chip 84 qubit quantum processor that it believes can scale to larger systems.

In October 2025, Rigetti was one of several quantum-computing companies reported to be involved in discussions with the Trump administration to secure federal funding in exchange for equity stakes.

In May 2026, Rigetti will receive up to $100 million in planned funding under the CHIPS and Science Act to address key technical challenges to develop and scale next generation superconducting quantum computing technologies and architectures, such as miniaturizing and integrating novel readout electronics and next generation cryostat architectures.

== Products and technology ==
Rigetti Computing is a full-stack quantum computing company, a term that indicates that the company designs and fabricates quantum chips, integrates them with a controlling architecture, and develops software for programmers to use to build algorithms for the chips.

=== Forest cloud computing platform ===
The company hosts a cloud computing platform called Forest, which gives developers access to quantum processors so they can write quantum algorithms for testing purposes. The computing platform is based on a custom instruction language the company developed called Quil, which stands for Quantum Instruction Language. Quil facilitates hybrid quantum/classical computing, and programs can be built and executed using open source Python tools. As of June 2017, the platform allows coders to write quantum algorithms for a simulation of a quantum chip with 36 qubits.

=== Fab-1 ===
The company operates a rapid prototyping fabrication ("fab") lab called Fab-1, designed to quickly create integrated circuits. Lab engineers design and generate experimental designs for 3D-integrated quantum circuits for qubit-based quantum hardware.

== Recognition ==
The company was recognized in 2016 by X-Prize founder Peter Diamandis as being one of the three leaders in the quantum computing space, along with IBM and Google. MIT Technology Review named the company one of the 50 smartest companies of 2017.

== Locations ==
Rigetti Computing is headquartered in Berkeley, California, where it hosts developmental systems and cooling equipment. The company also operates its Fab-1 manufacturing facility in nearby Fremont, California.

== See also ==
- D-Wave Systems
