= Jay Gambetta =

Australian physicist

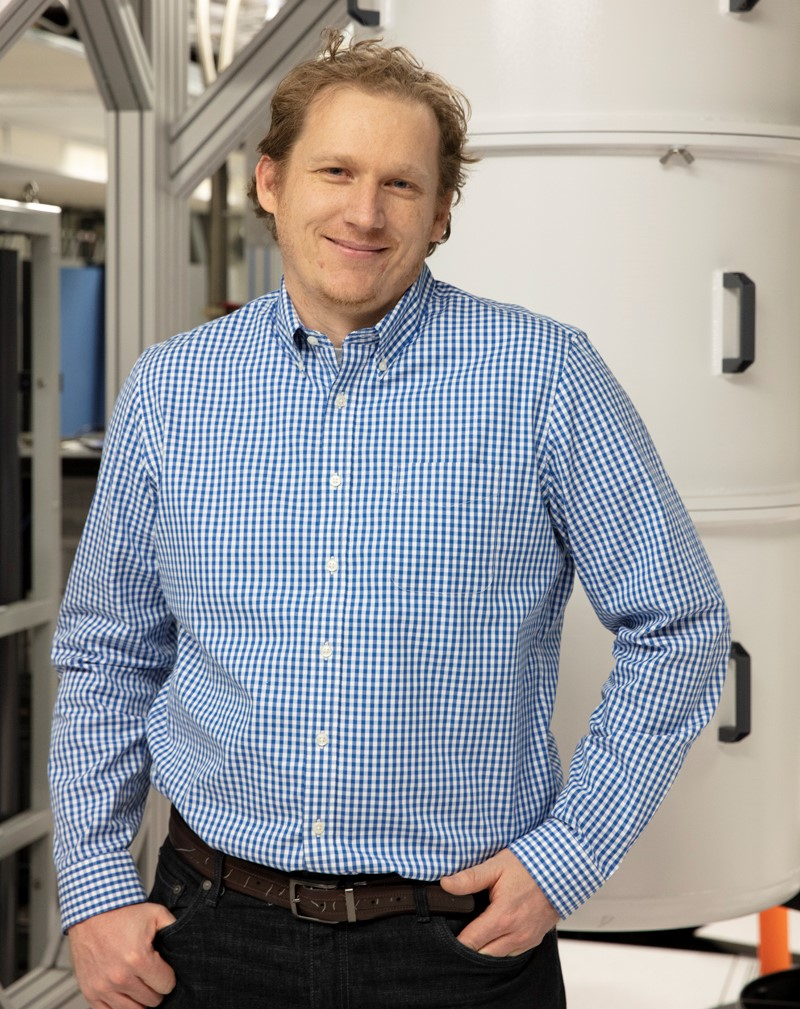
- Born: January 29, 1979 (age 47)
- Citizenship: United States
- Education: Griffith University (B.S.), Griffith University (Ph.D.)
- Scientific career
- Fields: Physics, Quantum Computing
- Workplaces: IBM Research; Institute for Quantum Computing; Yale University
- Doctoral advisor: Howard Wiseman

Jay Michael Gambetta is a scientist and Director of Research at IBM Thomas J Watson Research Center working to build a quantum computer.

== Education ==
Following his Bachelor of Science and Honours degree at Griffith University in 1999 (gaining four awards, including a University medal), Gambetta began a PhD under the supervision of Howard Wiseman in quantum foundations and non-Markovian open quantum systems. After graduating in 2004, Gambetta turned his research to the then-nascent field of superconducting quantum computing. He gained a post-doctorate post at Yale working for Steven Girvin. In 2007, he moved to the Institute for Quantum Computing in Waterloo, where he worked as a postdoc working for Raymond Laflamme and gained in 2009 a Junior Fellowship from the Canadian Institute for Advanced Research (CIFAR).

== Career ==
In 2011 he moved to private industry, joining the IBM effort to build a quantum computer based on superconducting qubits. He was appointed Vice President of quantum computing in 2019. As a scientist he has done work on quantum validation techniques, quantum codes, improved gates and coherence, error mitigation and near-term applications of quantum computing. In addition, he was a leader of the team to create the "IBM Quantum Experience", "Qiskit", the "IBM Quantum System One, and the "IBM Quantum System Two". Since October 2025 he holds the position of Director of IBM Research.

Gambetta's honours include being elected as a Fellow of the American Physical Society in 2014 and being named an IBM Fellow in 2018.

== Honors ==
- IBM Fellow (2018)
- Fellow of the American Physical Society (2014)

== Gambetta's Law ==
The observation that Quantum Volume is doubling every year is called "Gambetta's law."
