= Spin qubit quantum computer =

Proposed semiconductor implementation of quantum computers

The spin qubit quantum computer is a quantum computer based on controlling the spin of charge carriers (electrons and electron holes) in semiconductor devices. The first spin qubit quantum computer was proposed by Daniel Loss and David P. DiVincenzo in 1997. The proposal was to use the intrinsic spin-1/2 degree of freedom of individual electrons confined in quantum dots as qubits. This should not be confused with other proposals that use the nuclear spin as qubit, like the Kane quantum computer or the nuclear magnetic resonance quantum computer. Spin qubit quantum computers based on silicon atoms can be produced at industry standard silicon semiconductor wafer fabs used for logic chip production.

== Loss–DiVicenzo proposal ==
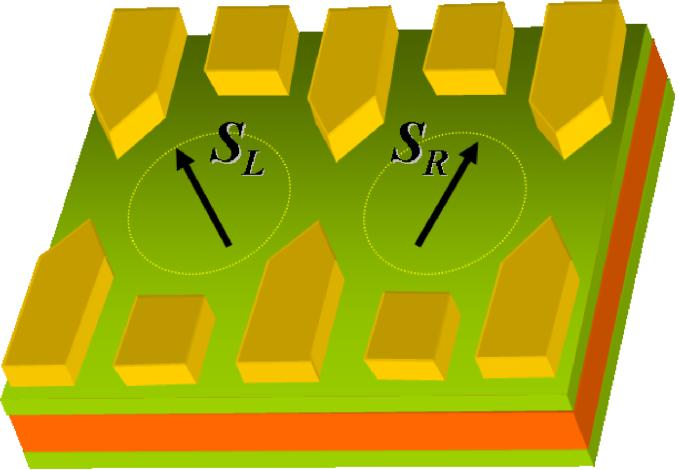
A double quantum dot. Each electron spin S_{L} or S_{R} define one quantum two-level system, or a spin qubit in the Loss–DiVincenzo proposal. A narrow gate between the two dots can modulate the coupling, allowing swap operations.

The Loss–DiVicenzo quantum computer proposal tried to fulfill DiVincenzo's criteria for a scalable quantum computer, namely:

- identification of well-defined qubits;
- reliable state preparation;
- low decoherence;
- accurate quantum gate operations and
- strong quantum measurements.

A candidate for such a quantum computer is a lateral quantum dot system. Earlier work on applications of quantum dots for quantum computing was done by Barenco et al.

=== Implementation of the two-qubit gate ===
The Loss–DiVincenzo quantum computer operates, basically, using inter-dot gate voltage for implementing swap operations and local magnetic fields (or any other local spin manipulation) for implementing the controlled NOT gate (CNOT gate).

The swap operation is achieved by applying a pulsed inter-dot gate voltage, so the exchange constant in the Heisenberg Hamiltonian becomes time-dependent:

$$H_{\rm s}(t) = J(t)\mathbf{S}_{\rm L} \cdot \mathbf{S}_{\rm R} .$$

This description is only valid if:

- the level spacing in the quantum-dot $\Delta E$ is much greater than $\; kT$
- the pulse time scale $\tau_{\rm s}$ is greater than $\hbar / \Delta E$, so there is no time for transitions to higher orbital levels to happen and
- the decoherence time $\Gamma ^{-1}$ is longer than $\tau_{\rm s}.$

$k$ is the Boltzmann constant and $T$ is the temperature in kelvins.

From the pulsed Hamiltonian follows the time evolution operator

$$U_{\rm s}(t) = {\mathcal{T}} \exp\left\{ -i\int_0^t dt' H_{\rm s}(t') \right\},$$

where ${\mathcal{T}}$ is the time-ordering symbol.

We can choose a specific duration of the pulse such that the integral in time over $J(t)$ gives $J_0 \tau_{\rm s} = \pi \pmod{2\pi},$ and $U_{\rm s}$ becomes the swap operator $U_{\rm s} (J_0 \tau_{\rm s} = \pi) \equiv U_{\rm sw}.$

This pulse run for half the time (with $J_0 \tau_{\rm s} = \pi /2$) results in a square root of swap gate, $U_{\rm sw}^{1/2}.$

The "XOR" gate may be achieved by combining $U_{\rm sw}^{1/2}$ operations with individual spin rotation operations:

$$U_{\rm XOR} = e^{i\frac{\pi}{2}S_{\rm L}^z}e^{-i\frac{\pi}{2}S_{\rm R}^z}U_{\rm sw}^{1/2}
e^{i \pi S_{\rm L}^z}U_{\rm sw}^{1/2}.$$

The $U_{\rm XOR}$ operator is a conditional phase shift (controlled-Z) for the state in the basis of $\mathbf{S}_{\rm L} + \mathbf{S}_{\rm R}$. It can be made into a CNOT gate by surrounding the desired target qubit with Hadamard gates.

== Experimental realizations ==
Spin qubits mostly have been implemented by locally depleting two-dimensional electron gases in semiconductors such a gallium arsenide and germanium. Spin qubits have also been implemented in other material systems, such as graphene. A more recent development is using silicon spin qubits, an approach that is pursued by Intel, among others. The advantage of the silicon platform is that it allows using modern semiconductor device fabrication for making the qubits. Some of these devices have a comparably high operation temperature of a few kelvins (hot qubits) which is advantageous for scaling the number of qubits in a quantum processor.

== See also ==
- Kane quantum computer
- Quantum dot cellular automaton
