= Daniel Loss =

Swiss theoretical physicist (born 1958)

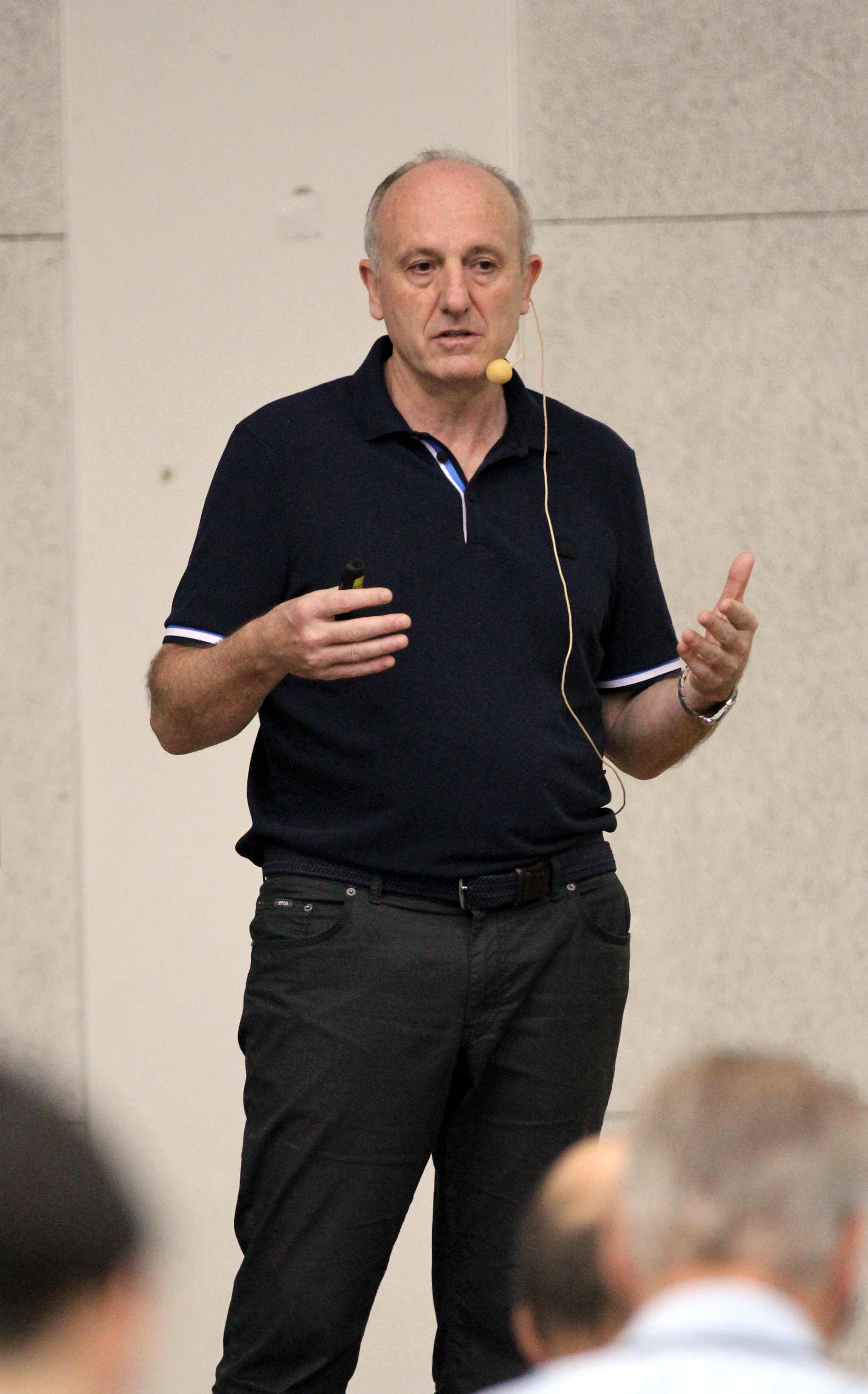
- Loss speaking at Ewha Womans University in 2019
- Born: 25 February 1958 (age 68); Winterthur, Switzerland
- Education: University of Zurich (PhD)
- Known for: Loss–DiVincenzo quantum computer
- Awards: The Humboldt Prize (2005); Marcel Benoist Prize (2010); Blaise Pascal Medal in Physics (2014); King Faisal International Prize (2017); Jan Czochralski Award (2024); Clarivate Citation Laureates in Physics (2025)
- Scientific career
- Fields: Theoretical physics
- Workplaces: King Fahd University of Petroleum and Minerals; University of Basel; Riken
- Doctoral advisor: Armin Thellung
- Website: quantumtheory.physik.unibas.ch/people/loss/

Daniel Loss (born 25 February 1958) is a Swiss theoretical physicist. He is best known for proposing, with David DiVincenzo at IBM Research, the Loss–DiVincenzo quantum computer in 1997, which would use electron spins in quantum dots as qubits.

== Life and career ==
Daniel Loss was born on 25 February 1958 in Winterthur, Switzerland. He studied medicine at the University of Zurich for two years before transferring to physics. In 1985, he obtained his PhD in physics from the University of Zurich with a thesis on statistical mechanics under the supervision of Armin Thellung. After postdoctoral stays in Zurich and at the University of Illinois in Urbana, where he worked with Anthony Leggett, he worked as a research scientist at the IBM T. J. Watson Research Center in Yorktown Heights. In 1993 he became professor at the Simon Fraser University in Vancouver, Canada, and since 1996 he is full professor at the University of Basel. He is also a professor of Theoretical Condensed Matter Physics at the King Fahd University of Petroleum and Minerals and Riken.

Loss's research concerns the quantum theory of condensed matter and solid-state physics. In particular, he studies spin and charge effects in semiconducting and magnetic nanostructures. He is one of the leading theorists investigating the realization of quantum information processing protocols in semiconductor structures. His 1998 paper, co-authored with David DiVincenzo, proposing the use of spin qubits in semiconductor quantum dots is the foundation of one of the main approaches towards the realization of a quantum computer and (as of 2025) has been cited more than 9,000 times. Further lines of research include decoherence, nuclear spin physics, magnon physics, topological matter, Majorana fermions and parafermions.

== Selected honors and awards ==
- 2000: Fellow of the American Physical Society
- 2005: Fellow of the Institute of Physics, UK
- 2005: Humboldt Research Prize
- 2010: Marcel Benoist Prize
- 2014: Blaise Pascal Medal in Physics from the European Academy of Sciences
- 2014: Member of the German National Academy of Sciences Leopoldina
- 2017: King Faisal International Prize in Science (Physics)
- 2021: External scientific member of the Max Planck Society
- 2024: Jan Czochralski Award
- 2025: Clarivate Citation Laureates in Physics
