= Cytosine =

Chemical compound in nucleic acids

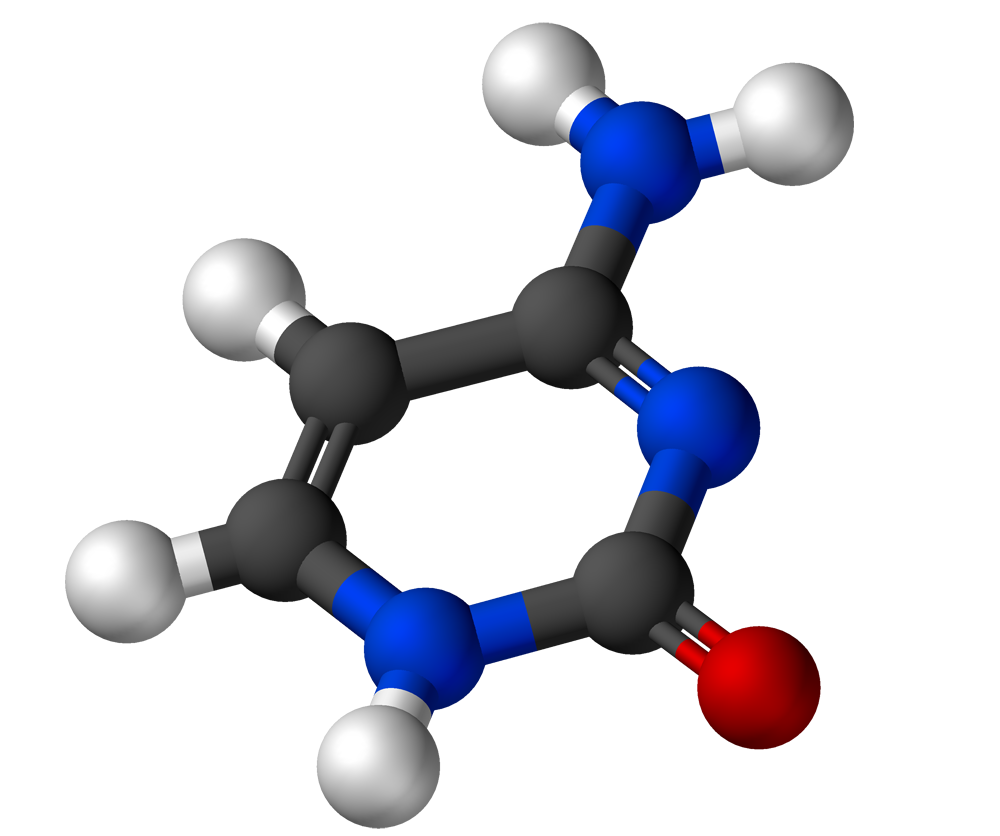

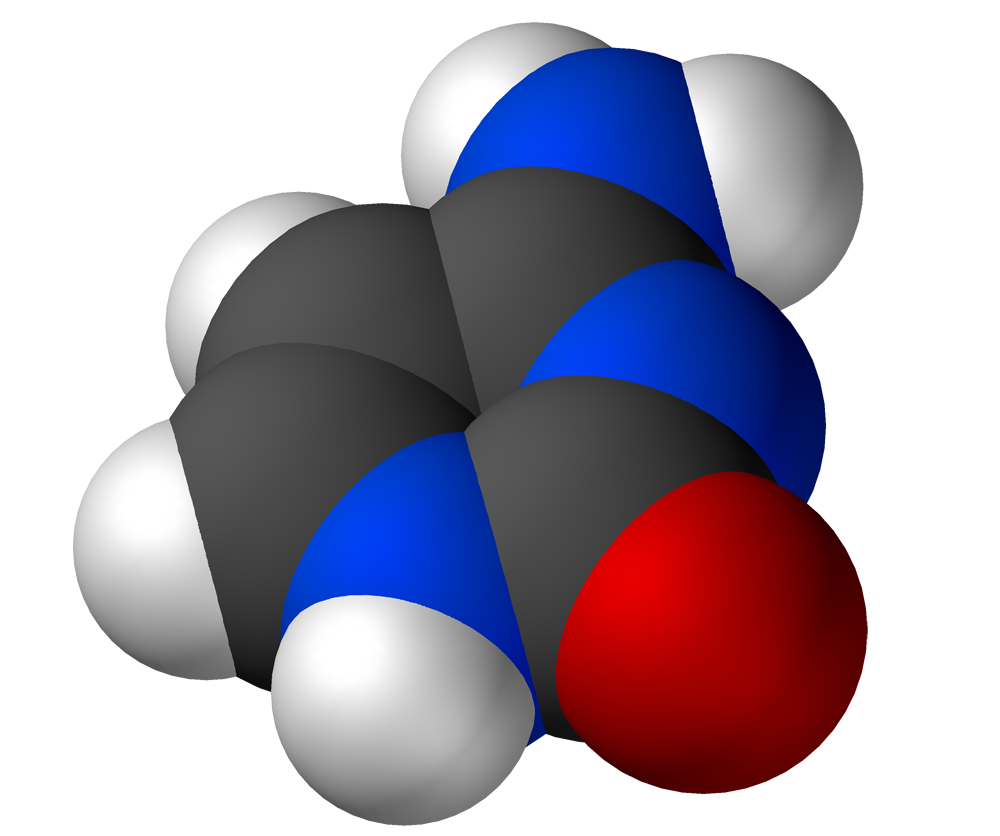

Names
- Preferred IUPAC name 4-Aminopyrimidin-2(1H)-one
- Other names 4-Amino-1H-pyrimidine-2-one

Identifiers
CAS Number	71-30-7
3D model (JSmol)	Interactive image
ChEBI	CHEBI:16040
ChEMBL	ChEMBL15913
ChemSpider	577
ECHA InfoCard	100.000.681
KEGG	C00380
MeSH	Cytosine
PubChem CID	597
UNII	8J337D1HZY
CompTox Dashboard (EPA)	DTXSID4044456
- InChI: InChI=1S/C4H5N3O/c5-3-1-2-6-4(8)7-3/h1-2H,(H3,5,6,7,8) Key: OPTASPLRGRRNAP-UHFFFAOYSA-N; InChI=1/C4H5N3O/c5-3-1-2-6-4(8)7-3/h1-2H,(H3,5,6,7,8) Key: OPTASPLRGRRNAP-UHFFFAOYAY
- SMILES: O=C1Nccc(N)n1

Properties
Chemical formula	C_{4}H_{5}N_{3}O
Molar mass	111.10 g/mol
Density	1.55 g/cm^{3} (calculated)
Melting point	320 to 325 °C (608 to 617 °F; 593 to 598 K) (decomposes)
Acidity (pK_{a})	4.45 (secondary), 12.2 (primary)
Magnetic susceptibility (χ)	−55.8·10^{−6} cm^{3}/mol
- Except where otherwise noted, data are given for materials in their standard state (at 25 °C [77 °F], 100 kPa). verify (what is ?) Infobox references

Cytosine (Note: Pronunciation: /ˈsaɪtəˌsiːn, -ˌziːn, -ˌsɪn/) (symbol C or Cyt) is one of the four nucleotide bases found in DNA and RNA, along with adenine, guanine, and thymine (uracil in RNA). It is a pyrimidine derivative, with a heterocyclic aromatic ring and two substituents attached (an amine group at position 4 and a keto group at position 2). The nucleoside of cytosine is cytidine. In Watson–Crick base pairing, it forms three hydrogen bonds with guanine.

== History ==
Cytosine was discovered and named by Albrecht Kossel and Albert Neumann in 1894 when it was hydrolyzed from calf thymus tissues. A structure was proposed in 1903, and was synthesized (and thus confirmed) in the laboratory in the same year.

In 1998, cytosine was used in an early demonstration of quantum information processing when Oxford University researchers implemented the Deutsch–Jozsa algorithm on a two qubit nuclear magnetic resonance quantum computer (NMRQC).

In March 2015, NASA scientists reported the formation of cytosine, along with uracil and thymine, from pyrimidine under the space-like laboratory conditions, which is of interest because pyrimidine has been found in meteorites although its origin is unknown.

== Chemical reactions ==
Cytosine

Guanine

Cytosine and guanine with the direction of hydrogen bonding indicated (arrow points positive to negative charge).
Methylation of cytosine occurs on carbon number 5.

Cytosine can be found as part of DNA, as part of RNA, or as a part of a nucleotide. As cytidine triphosphate (CTP), it can act as a co-factor to enzymes, and can transfer a phosphate to convert adenosine diphosphate (ADP) to adenosine triphosphate (ATP).

In DNA and RNA, cytosine is paired with guanine. However, it is inherently unstable, and can change into uracil (spontaneous deamination). This can lead to a point mutation if not repaired by the DNA repair enzymes such as uracil glycosylase, which cleaves a uracil in DNA.

Cytosine can also be methylated into 5-methylcytosine by an enzyme called DNA methyltransferase or be methylated and hydroxylated to make 5-hydroxymethylcytosine. The difference in rates of deamination of cytosine and 5-methylcytosine (to uracil and thymine) forms the basis of bisulfite sequencing.

== Biological function ==
When found third in a codon of RNA, cytosine is synonymous with uracil, as they are interchangeable as the third base. When found as the second base in a codon, the third is always interchangeable. For example, UCU, UCC, UCA and UCG are all serine, regardless of the third base.

Active enzymatic deamination of cytosine or 5-methylcytosine by the APOBEC family of cytosine deaminases could have both beneficial and detrimental implications on various cellular processes as well as on organismal evolution. The implications of deamination on 5-hydroxymethylcytosine, on the other hand, remains less understood.

== Theoretical aspects ==
Until October 2021, Cytosine had not been found in meteorites, which suggested the first strands of RNA and DNA had to look elsewhere to obtain this building block. Cytosine likely formed within some meteorite parent bodies, however did not persist within these bodies due to an effective deamination reaction into uracil.

In October 2021, Cytosine was announced as having been found in meteorites by researchers in a joint Japan/NASA project, that used novel methods of detection which avoided damaging nucleotides as they were extracted from meteorites.

== External links and citations ==
- Cytosine MS Spectrum
- EINECS number 200-749-5
- Shapiro R (1999). "Prebiotic cytosine synthesis: a critical analysis and implications for the origin of life". Proc. Natl. Acad. Sci. U.S.A. 96 (8): 4396–401. Bibcode:1999PNAS...96.4396S. doi:10.1073/pnas.96.8.4396. PMC 16343. PMID 10200273.
