= Steven J. van Enk =

Dutch theoretical physicist

- Born: Steven Jacob van Enk; 1965 (age 60–61)
- Education: University of Leiden (Ph.D); University of Utrecht (B.S.)
- Scientific career
- Workplaces: Max-Planck-Institute of Quantum Optics; Foundation for Research & Technology – Hellas; California Institute of Technology; Bell Labs; University of Oregon
- Thesis: Light as a Thermodynamic Force (1992)
- Doctoral advisor: Gerard Nienhuis

Steven Jacob van Enk (born 1965) is a physicist on the faculty of the University of Oregon whose fields of study are theoretical quantum information and quantum optics.

== Early life and education ==
Steven Jacob van Enk was born in 1965 in Veenendaal, the Netherlands and lived in Holland until 1993. He earned a Ph.D. at the Universiteit Leiden in 1992, with his dissertation titled, Light as a Thermodynamic Force, advised by Gerard Nienhuis.

Van Enk is a national FIDE Master chess player.

== Career ==
Van Enk held postdoc positions at the MaxPlanck Institute of Quantum Optics, at the University of Innsbruck, and at Caltech, where he worked with H. Jeff Kimble, a leading theorist in quantum information. Van Enk was then a member of the technical staff at Bell Labs for six years.

In 2006 Van Enk joined the University of Oregon Physics Department, where he became a full professor in 2009. His work has been partially supported by N.S.F. grants.

== Selected publications ==
- Chou, C. W.; de Riedmatten, H.; Felinto, D.; Polyakov, S. V.; Van Enk, S. J.; Kimble, H. J. (December 2005). "Measurement-induced entanglement for excitation stored in remote atomic ensembles". Nature. 438 (7069): 828–832. arXiv:quant-ph/0510055. doi:10.1038/nature04353. ISSN 1476-4687.
- Van Enk, S. J.; Hirota, O. (July 13, 2001). "Entangled coherent states: Teleportation and decoherence". Physical Review A. 64 (2) 022313. arXiv:quant-ph/0012086. doi:10.1103/PhysRevA.64.022313.
- Van Enk, S. J. (December 29, 2005). "Single-particle entanglement". Physical Review A. 72 (6) 064306. arXiv:quant-ph/0507189. doi:10.1103/PhysRevA.72.064306.
- Van Enk, S. J.; Beenakker, C. W. J. (March 16, 2012). "Measuring Tr ρ n Single Copies of ρ Using Random Measurements". Physical Review Letters. 108 (11) 110503. arXiv:1112.1027. doi:10.1103/PhysRevLett.108.110503.
- Van Enk, S. J.; Pike, R. (August 6, 2002). "Classical rules in quantum games". Physical Review A. 66 (2) 024306. arXiv:quant-ph/0203133. doi:10.1103/PhysRevA.66.024306.

== Awards, honors ==
- 2010 American Physical Society Fellow, cited "For pioneering contributions in theoretical quantum information and quantum optics, including entanglement verification, quantum communication and teleportation, and angular momentum of photons."

== See also ==
- Cat state
