= Cat qubit quantum computer =

Proposed approach to a large-scale quantum computer based on Schrödinger cat states

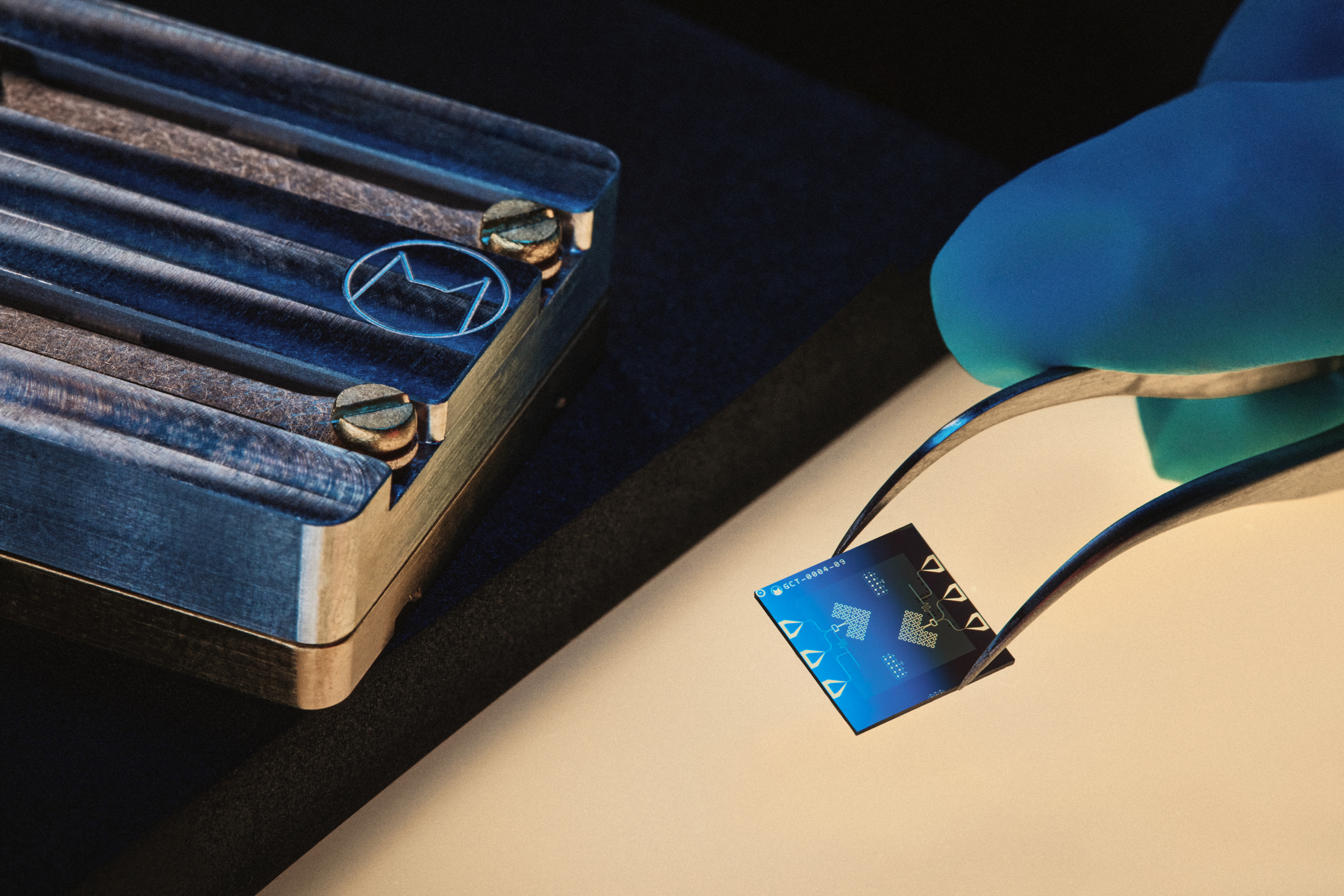
Cat qubit quantum chips use superconducting circuits to generate, stabilize, and control cat qubits.

A cat qubit quantum computer is one proposed approach to a large-scale quantum computer based on Schrödinger cat states.

Cat states are superpositions of two coherent states of light. Cat qubits encode quantum information in these states.

They are designed to provide built in protection against certain types of errors, particularly bit flips, making quantum error correction more efficient in superconducting circuits.

The approach is being developed by Alice & Bob and Amazon Web Services (AWS), among others.

== Background ==
Cat qubits use coherent states of a quantum harmonic oscillator—microwave photons trapped in a superconducting resonator—as their logical 0 and 1 states. The name derives from the Schrödinger's cat thought experiment, in which a system exists in a superposition of two macroscopically distinct states.

Errors in quantum computation generally occur as bit-flip errors — changing a qubit's logical state from 0 to 1 or vice versa — and phase-flip errors, which alter the relative phase between superposed states.

The key property of cat qubits is that the probability of a bit-flip decreases exponentially with the number of photons in the coherent state. In conventional superconducting transmon-based architectures using surface codes, correcting both types of errors can require a significant number of physical qubits to realize a single error-free logical qubit.

Cat qubits can be stabilized against bit-flip errors by coupling the qubit to an environment that preferentially exchanges pairs of photons with the system. This autonomously counteracts the effects of some errors that generate bit-flips and ensures that the quantum state remains within the desired error-corrected subspace.

The intrinsic suppression of bit flips means that error correction only needs to address one dominant error channel, a property known as a noise-bias. This allows for the use of one-dimensional error correction codes, such as the classical repetition code, rather than two-dimensional surface codes.

As a result, cat qubits could encode a logical qubit in a more hardware-efficient architecture to enable a universal set of fully protected logical operations while avoiding the significant overhead required by other error-correcting codes.

This design suggests that cat qubits demonstrate the potential to efficiently scale to full error correction and fault tolerant quantum computing.

== History ==
In 2001, a superposition of coherent states was suggested for quantum computation. Cat qubits were first proposed as the building blocks for a universal fault-tolerant quantum computer in 2001.

In 2015, Devoret et al. published the first experimental demonstration of cat qubits.

In 2020, cat qubits in an oscillator exponentially suppressed bit-flips, demonstrating the potential for quantum computation with reduced overhead.

In 2024, Alice & Bob researchers extended the bit-flip lifetime – the duration a qubit can maintain its state before it experiences a bit-flip error – to seven minutes.

In 2025, AWS developed a chip that demonstrated a 1.65% per cycle for a five-cat qubit array. Achieving this degree of error suppression with larger error-correcting codes previously required tens of additional qubits. However, the chip still needs to address both bit-flip and phase-flip errors as it incorporates both transmons and cat qubits.
