= Kane quantum computer =

Type of quantum computer

The Kane quantum computer is a proposal for a scalable quantum computer proposed by Bruce Kane in 1998, who was then at the University of New South Wales. Often thought of as a hybrid between quantum dot and nuclear magnetic resonance (NMR) quantum computers, the Kane computer is based on an array of individual phosphorus donor atoms embedded in a pure silicon lattice. Both the nuclear spins of the donors and the spins of the donor electrons participate in the computation.

Unlike many quantum computation schemes, the Kane quantum computer is in principle scalable to an arbitrary number of qubits. This is possible because qubits may be individually addressed by electrical means.

== Description ==
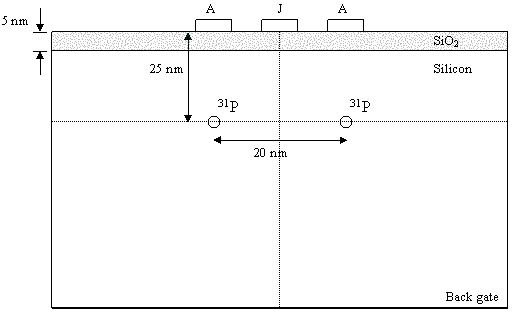

The original proposal calls for phosphorus donors to be placed in an array with a spacing of 20 nm, approximately 20 nm below the surface. An insulating oxide layer is grown on top of the silicon. Metal A gates are deposited on the oxide above each donor, and J gates between adjacent donors.

The phosphorus donors are isotopically pure ^{31}P, which have a nuclear spin of 1/2. The silicon substrate is isotopically pure ^{28}Si which has nuclear spin 0. Using the nuclear spin of the P donors as a method to encode qubits has two major advantages. Firstly, the state has an extremely long decoherence time, perhaps on the order of 10^{18} seconds at millikelvin temperatures. Secondly, the qubits may be manipulated by applying an oscillating magnetic field, as in typical NMR proposals. By altering the voltage on the A gates, it should be possible to alter the Larmor frequency of individual donors. This allows them to be addressed individually, by bringing specific donors into resonance with the applied oscillating magnetic field.

Nuclear spins alone will not interact significantly with other nuclear spins 20 nm away. Nuclear spin is useful to perform single-qubit operations, but to make a quantum computer, two-qubit operations are also required. This is the role of electron spin in this design. Under A-gate control, the spin is transferred from the nucleus to the donor electron. Then, a potential is applied to the J gate, drawing adjacent donor electrons into a common region, greatly enhancing the interaction between the neighboring spins. By controlling the J gate voltage, two-qubit operations are possible.

Kane's proposal for readout was to apply an electric field to encourage spin-dependent tunneling of an electron to transform two neutral donors to a D^{+}–D^{–} state, that is, one where two electrons associate with the same donor. The charge excess is then detected using a single-electron transistor. This method has two major difficulties. Firstly, the D^{–} state has strong coupling with the environment and hence a short decoherence time. Secondly and perhaps more importantly, it's not clear that the D^{–} state has a sufficiently long lifetime to allow for readout—the electron tunnels into the conduction band.

== Development ==
Since Kane's proposal, under the guidance of Robert Clark and now Michelle Simmons, pursuing realization of the Kane quantum computer has become the primary quantum computing effort in Australia. Theorists have put forward a number of proposals for improved readout. Experimentally, atomic-precision deposition of phosphorus atoms has been achieved using a scanning tunneling microscope (STM) technique in 2003. Detection of the movement of single electrons between small, dense clusters of phosphorus donors has also been achieved. While this group remains optimistic that a practical, large-scale Kane quantum computer can be built, others believe that the idea needs to be modified.

In 2020, Andrea Morello and others demonstrated that an antimony nucleus (with eight spin states) embedded in silicon could be controlled using an electric field, rather than a magnetic field.

== See also ==
- Spin qubit quantum computer
- Nuclear magnetic resonance quantum computer
