= Hanyuan-1 =

First circuit-based commercial quantum computer

- Developer: Chinese Academy of Sciences' Innovation Academy for Precision Measurement Science and Technology
- Type: Quantum computer
- Released: 2025

Hanyuan-1, or Hanyuan No. 1, is China's first commercial quantum computer. It was developed by the Chinese Academy of Sciences' Innovation Academy for Precision Measurement Science and Technology. It is able to operate at room temperature and uses cold atoms as qubits. It is commercially available with current orders totalling ¥40 million RMB. The Hanyuan-1 contains 100 qubits. It can fit within three standard equipment racks, and can manage complex applications in the area of logistics optimization and financial modeling.
