= Alice & Bob (company) =

Quantum computing company

- Type: Privately Held Company
- Industry: Quantum computing
- Founded: 2020
- Founder: Théau Peronnin; Raphaël Lescanne
- Headquarters: Paris, France; Boston, Massachusetts
- Key people: Théau Peronnin, CEO; Raphaël Lescanne, CTO
- Number of employees: 110
- Website: www.alice-bob.com

Alice & Bob is a quantum computing company based in Paris and Boston. The company is known for its cat qubit quantum architecture and its work in quantum error correction.

== History ==
Alice & Bob was spun out of a federation of French research labs by Théau Peronnin and Raphaël Lescanne. While pursuing his PhD in physics, Peronnin was part of the quantum-electronics group at École normale supérieure, building the academic foundations for quantum computers. Meanwhile, Lescanne published a paper on exponential suppression of bit-flips in a qubit encoded in an oscillator. Together, Peronnin and Lescanne co-founded Alice & Bob in 2020 to continue this work.

Since then, the company has raised more than $134 million in funding to develop fault-tolerant quantum computers based on cat qubits.

In 2023, Alice & Bob opened a subsidiary in Boston to facilitate the company's expansion.

The following year, the company was selected for France's $548 million PROQCIMA initiative, a key component of the nation’s National Strategy for Quantum.

In 2025, Alice & Bob announced plans to build a $50 million advanced quantum computing laboratory in Paris to support product development and testing.

Later that year, DARPA selected the company to join its Quantum Benchmarking initiative, a project focused on identifying which approaches can deliver an industrially useful quantum computer.

== Technology ==
Alice & Bob's architecture is based on cat qubits, named after Schrödinger's cat thought experiment.

Cat qubits are designed to exponentially reduce bit-flip errors, thereby reducing the resources required for error correction.

Alice & Bob uses a two-photon injection scheme to maintain the system energy level and protect against decoherence. This results in exponential protection against bit flips and a reduction in chip area required for implementation.

By improving hardware efficiency with built-in error correction, Alice & Bob plans to develop a 100 logical qubit device by 2030 using this cat qubit approach.
