= Cat state =

Quantum state, of opposed conditions

In quantum mechanics, the cat state, named after Schrödinger's cat, refers to a quantum state. Generalizing Erwin Schrödinger's thought experiment, a cat state is a quantum superposition of two macroscopically distinct states. A cat state could be of one or more modes or particles, yet not necessarily an entangled state. Such cat states have been experimentally realized in various ways and at various scales.

The most common example of a cat state is the superposition of two coherent states of a single optical mode of light. These states are of special interest for the development of quantum computing.

== Over distinct particles ==
Concretely, a cat state can refer to the possibility that multiple atoms be in a superposition of all spin up and all spin down, known as a Greenberger–Horne–Zeilinger state (GHZ state), which is highly entangled. Since GHZ states are relatively difficult to produce but easy to verify they are often used as a benchmark for different platforms. Such a state for six atoms was realized by a team led by David Wineland at NIST in 2005 and the largest states have since grown to beyond 20.

Optically, the GHZ state can be realized with several distinct photons in a superposition of all polarized vertically and all polarized horizontally. These have been experimentally realized by a team led by Pan Jianwei at University of Science and Technology of China, for instance, four-photon entanglement, five-photon entanglement, six-photon entanglement, eight-photon entanglement, and five-photon ten-qubit cat state.

This spin up/down formulation was proposed by David Bohm, who conceived of spin as an observable in a version of thought experiments formulated in the 1935 EPR paradox.

== Single mode ==
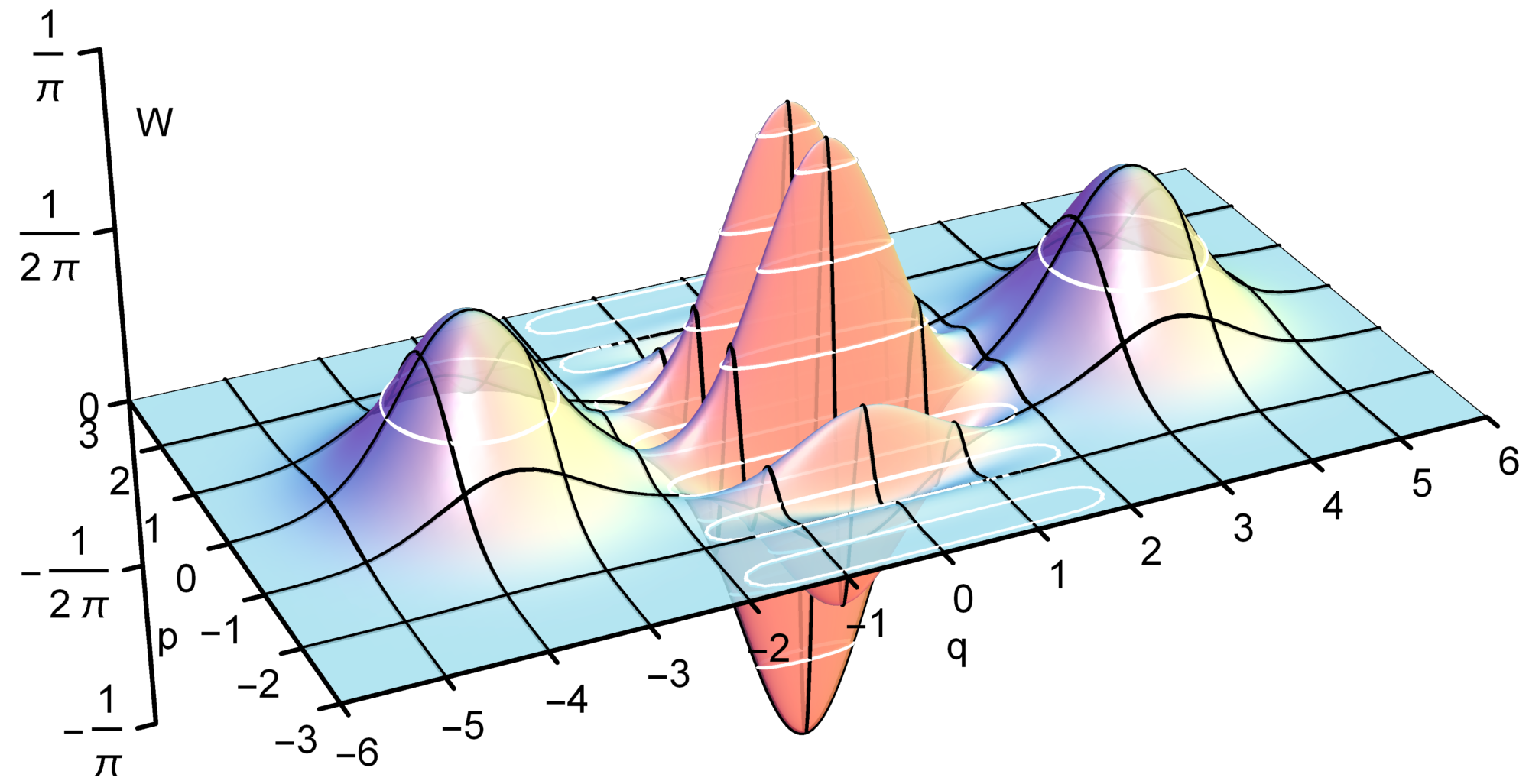
Wigner quasiprobability distribution of an odd cat state of α = 2.5

Time evolution of the probability distribution with quantum phase (color) of a cat state with α = 3. The two coherent portions interfere in the center.

In quantum optics, a cat state is defined as the quantum superposition of two opposite-phase coherent states of a single optical mode (e.g., a quantum superposition of large positive electric field and large negative electric field):
$$|\mathrm{cat}_e\rangle \propto |\alpha\rangle + |{-}\alpha\rangle,$$
where
$$|\alpha\rangle = e^{-\frac{1}{2}|\alpha|^2} \sum_{n=0}^\infty \frac{\alpha^n}{\sqrt{n!}} |n\rangle$$
and
$$|{-}\alpha\rangle = e^{-\frac{1}{2}|{-}\alpha|^2} \sum_{n=0}^\infty \frac{({-}\alpha)^n}{\sqrt{n!}} |n\rangle$$
are coherent states defined in the number (Fock) basis. Notice that if we add the two states together, the resulting cat state only contains even Fock state terms:
$$|\mathrm{cat}_e\rangle \propto 2e^{-\frac{1}{2}|\alpha|^2} \left(\frac{\alpha^0}{\sqrt{0!}} |0\rangle + \frac{\alpha^2}{\sqrt{2!}} |2\rangle + \frac{\alpha^4}{\sqrt{4!}} |4\rangle + \dots\right).$$

As a result of this property, the above cat state is often referred to as an even cat state. Alternatively, we can define an odd cat state as
$$|\mathrm{cat}_o\rangle \propto |\alpha\rangle - |{-}\alpha\rangle,$$

which only contains odd Fock states:
$$|\mathrm{cat}_o\rangle \propto 2e^{-\frac{1}{2}|\alpha|^2} \left(\frac{\alpha^1}{\sqrt{1!}} |1\rangle + \frac{\alpha^3}{\sqrt{3!}} |3\rangle + \frac{\alpha^5}{\sqrt{5!}} |5\rangle + \dots\right).$$

Even and odd coherent states were first introduced by Dodonov, Malkin, and Man'ko in 1974.

=== Linear superposition of coherent states ===
Wigner function of an evolving Schrödinger cat state

A simple example of a cat state is a linear superposition of coherent states with opposite phases, when each state has the same weight:
$$\begin{align}
|\mathrm{cat}_e\rangle &= \frac{1}{\sqrt{2\left(1 + e^{-2|\alpha|^2}\right)}} \big(|\alpha\rangle+|{-}\alpha\rangle\big), \\
|\mathrm{cat}_o\rangle &= \frac{1}{\sqrt{2\left(1 - e^{-2|\alpha|^2}\right)}} \big(|\alpha\rangle-|{-}\alpha\rangle\big), \\
|\mathrm{cat}_\theta\rangle &= \frac{1}{\sqrt{2\left(1 + \cos(\theta)e^{-2|\alpha|^2}\right)}} \big(|\alpha\rangle + e^{i\theta} |{-}\alpha\rangle\big).
\end{align}$$

Wigner function of $|\mathrm{cat}_\theta\rangle$ as $\theta$ changes (resulting in moving interference fringes), interleaved with backward and forward time evolution

The larger the value of $\alpha$, the lower the overlap between the two macroscopic classical coherent states $\exp(-2\alpha^2)$, and the better it approaches an ideal cat state. However, the production of cat states with a large mean photon number $(=|\alpha^2|)$ is difficult. A typical way to produce approximate cat states is through photon subtraction from a squeezed vacuum state. This method usually is restricted to small values of $\alpha$, and such states have been referred to as Schrödinger "kitten" states in the literature. A method to generate a larger cat state using homodyne conditioning on a number state split by a beam splitter was suggested and experimentally demonstrated with a clear separation between the two Gaussian peaks in the Wigner function. More methods have been proposed to produce larger coherent state superpositions through multiphoton subtraction, through ancilla-assisted subtraction, or through multiple photon catalysis steps. Optical methods to "breed" cat states by entangling two smaller "kitten" states on a beamsplitter and performing a homodyne measurement on one output have also been proposed and experimentally demonstrated. If the two "kittens" each have magnitude $|\alpha|,$ then when a probabilistic homodyne measurement on the amplitude-quadrature of one beamsplitter output yields a measurement of Q = 0, the remaining output state is projected into an enlarged cat state where the magnitude has been increased to $\sqrt2 |\alpha|.$

Coherent state superpositions have been proposed for quantum computing.

=== Higher-order cat states ===
Wigner quasiprobability distribution of cat states, grid. Cat states with 2, 3, 4 cats. The separation between cats range from 0.5, 1, 2, 4, showing increasingly sharp inference.

It is also possible to control the phase-space angle between the involved coherent amplitudes so that they are not diametrically opposed. This is distinct from controlling the quantum phase relation between the states. Cat states with 3 and 4 subcomponents have been experimentally realized, e.g., one might have a triangular cat state:

$$|\mathrm{cat}_\text{tri}\rangle \propto |\alpha\rangle + \left|e^{i2\pi/3}\alpha\right\rangle + \left|e^{i4\pi/3} \alpha\right\rangle,$$

A very big cat state, with 10 cats separated at $\alpha = 10$.

or a triangle superposed with vacuum state:

$$|\mathrm{cat}_\mathrm{tri'}\rangle \propto |0\rangle + |\alpha\rangle + \left|e^{i2\pi/3}\alpha\right\rangle + \left|e^{i4\pi/3}\alpha\right\rangle,$$

or a square cat state:
$$|\mathrm{cat}_\text{square}\rangle \propto |\alpha\rangle + |i\alpha\rangle + |{-}\alpha\rangle + |{-}i\alpha\rangle.$$

The three-component cat states naturally appear as the low-energy eigenstates of three atoms, trapped above a chiral waveguide.

=== Decoherence ===
Animation showing first the "growth" of a pure even cat state up to α = 2, followed by dissipation of the cat state by losses (the rapid onset of decoherence visible as a loss of the middle interference fringes)

The quantum superposition in cat states becomes more fragile and susceptible to decoherence, the larger they are. For a given well-separated cat state (|α| > 2), an absorption of 1/|α|^{2} is sufficient to convert the cat state to a nearly equal mixture of even and odd cat states. For example, with α = 10, i.e., ~100 photons, an absorption of just 1% will convert an even cat state to be 57%/43% even/odd, even though this reduces the coherent amplitude by only 0.5%. In other words, the superposition is effectively ruined after the probable loss of just a single photon.

== Cat qubit ==
Cat states can also be used to encode quantum information in the framework of bosonic codes. The idea of using cat qubits as a bosonic code for quantum information processing traces back to Cochrane et al. Quantum teleportation using cat states was suggested by Van Enk and Hirota and Jeong et al. in view of traveling light fields. Jeong et al. showed that one can discriminate between all of the four Bell states in the cat-state basis using a beam splitter and two photon-number parity detectors, while this task is known to be highly difficult using other optical approaches with discrete-variable qubits. The Bell-state measurement scheme using the cat-state basis and its variants have been found to be useful for quantum computing and communication. Jeong and Kim and Ralph et al. suggested universal quantum computing schemes using cat qubits, and it was shown that this type of approach can be made fault-tolerant.

In February 2025, Amazon announced a quantum computing processor prototype, nicknamed "Ocelot", that utilizes cat qubits for bosonic quantum error correction. While Ocelot implements both cat qubits and transmons, Alice & Bob's quantum architecture utilizes cat qubits exclusively.

=== Bosonic codes ===
In quantum information theory, bosonic codes encode information in the infinite-dimensional Hilbert space of a single mode.

This is in stark contrast with most encodings for which a 2-dimensional system - a qubit - is used to encode information. The numerous dimensions enable a first degree of redundancy and hence of error protection within a single physical degree of freedom which may consist of the propagating mode of an optical set-up, the vibration mode of a trapped ion or the stationary mode of a microwave resonator. Moreover, the dominant decoherence channel is photon loss and no extra decay channels are known to be added if the number of photons is increased. Hence, to identify a potential error, one needs to measure a single error syndrome, thereby allowing one to realize a significant hardware economy. In these respects, bosonic codes are a hardware efficient path towards quantum error correction.

All the bosonic encodings require non-linearities to be generated, stabilized and measured. In particular, they can't be generated or stabilized with only a linear modes and linear displacements. In practice, ancillary systems are needed for stabilization and error tracking. However, the ancillary systems also have errors, which can in reverse ruin the quantum information. Being immune to these errors is called fault tolerance and is critical. In particular, even though a linear memory is only subject to photon loss errors, it also experiences dephasing once coupled to a non-linear ancillary system.

=== Cat codes ===
Bosonic codes draw their error protection from encoding quantum information in distant locations of the mode phase space. Among these bosonic codes, Schrödinger cat codes encode information as a superposition of coherent states $|\alpha\rangle$ where $\alpha$ is the complex amplitude of the field, which are quasi-classical states of the mode.

For instance, the two-component cat code may be defined as:

$$|\mathrm{+}\rangle \propto |\alpha\rangle+|{-}\alpha\rangle,$$
$$|\mathrm{-}\rangle \propto |\alpha\rangle-|{-}\alpha\rangle,$$

The computational basis states $|\mathrm{0}\rangle = |+\rangle+|{-}\rangle$, and $|\mathrm{1}\rangle = |+\rangle-|{-}\rangle$, converge towards the coherent states $|\alpha\rangle$ and $|-\alpha\rangle$ when $\alpha$ is large.

Another example is the four-component cat code defined as:
$$|\mathrm{+}\rangle \propto |\alpha\rangle+|{i}\alpha\rangle + |{-}\alpha\rangle+|{-i}\alpha\rangle$$
$$|\mathrm{-}\rangle \propto |\alpha\rangle-|{i}\alpha\rangle + |{-}\alpha\rangle-|{-i}\alpha\rangle$$

Other cat states encoding exist such as squeezed cat codes or pair cat codes in 2-mode system.

=== 2-component cat code ===
The two basis states of this code $|\mathrm{0}\rangle$ and $|\mathrm{1}\rangle$ are the coherent states $|\alpha\rangle$ and $|{-}\alpha\rangle$ to a very good approximation when $\alpha$ is large. In the language of quantum information processing, cat-state decoherence, mostly originating from single photon loss, is associated with phase-flips. On the contrary, bit-flips bear a clear classical analogue: the random switch between the two coherent states.

Contrary to the other bosonic codes that aim at delocalizing information in both direct space and in reciprocal space, the 2-component cat encoding relaxes one constraint by only delocalizing in one space. The resulting qubit is only protected against one of the two error channels (bit-flips) but consequently the acquired protection is more efficient in terms of required photon number. In order to correct against the remaining error channel (phase-flips), one needs to concatenate with another code in a bias preserving way, such as with a repetition code or a surface code.

As stated above, even though a resonator alone typically suffer only from single photon loss, a finite temperature environment causes single photon gain and the coupling to the non-linear resources effectively induces dephasing. Moreover, single photon losses do not only flip the parity of the cat state but also cause a deterministic decrease of the amplitude of coherent states, the cat "shrinks". All these effects tend to cause bit-flips. Hence, to protect the encoded states several stabilization procedures were proposed:

- dissipative: use engineered dissipation such that its steady states form the cat-qubit manifold.
- hamiltonian: use an engineered Hamiltonian such that its degenerate ground states form the cat-qubit manifold
- gate-based: regularly re-inflate the cat using optimal control, computer-generated pulses.

The two first approaches are called autonomous since they don't requires active correction, and can be combined. So far, autonomous correction has been proven more fault-tolerant than gate-based correction because of the type of interaction used in gate-based correction.

Bit flip suppression with $\alpha^{2}$ was demonstrated for two-legged cats with dissipative stabilization at the mere cost of linear increase of phase flip due to single photon loss.

=== 4-component cat code ===
In order to add first order protection against phase-flips within a single degree of freedom, a higher dimension manifold is required. The 4-component cat code uses the even-parity submanifold of the superposition of 4 coherent states to encode information. The odd-parity submanifold is also 2-dimensional and serves as an error space since a single photon loss switches the parity of the state. Hence, monitoring the parity is sufficient to detect errors caused by single photon loss. Just as in the 2-component cat code, one needs to stabilize the code in order to prevent bit-flips. The same strategies can be used but are challenging to implement experimentally because higher order non-linearities are required.
