= IBM Q System One =

First circuit-based commercial quantum computer

IBM Quantum System One

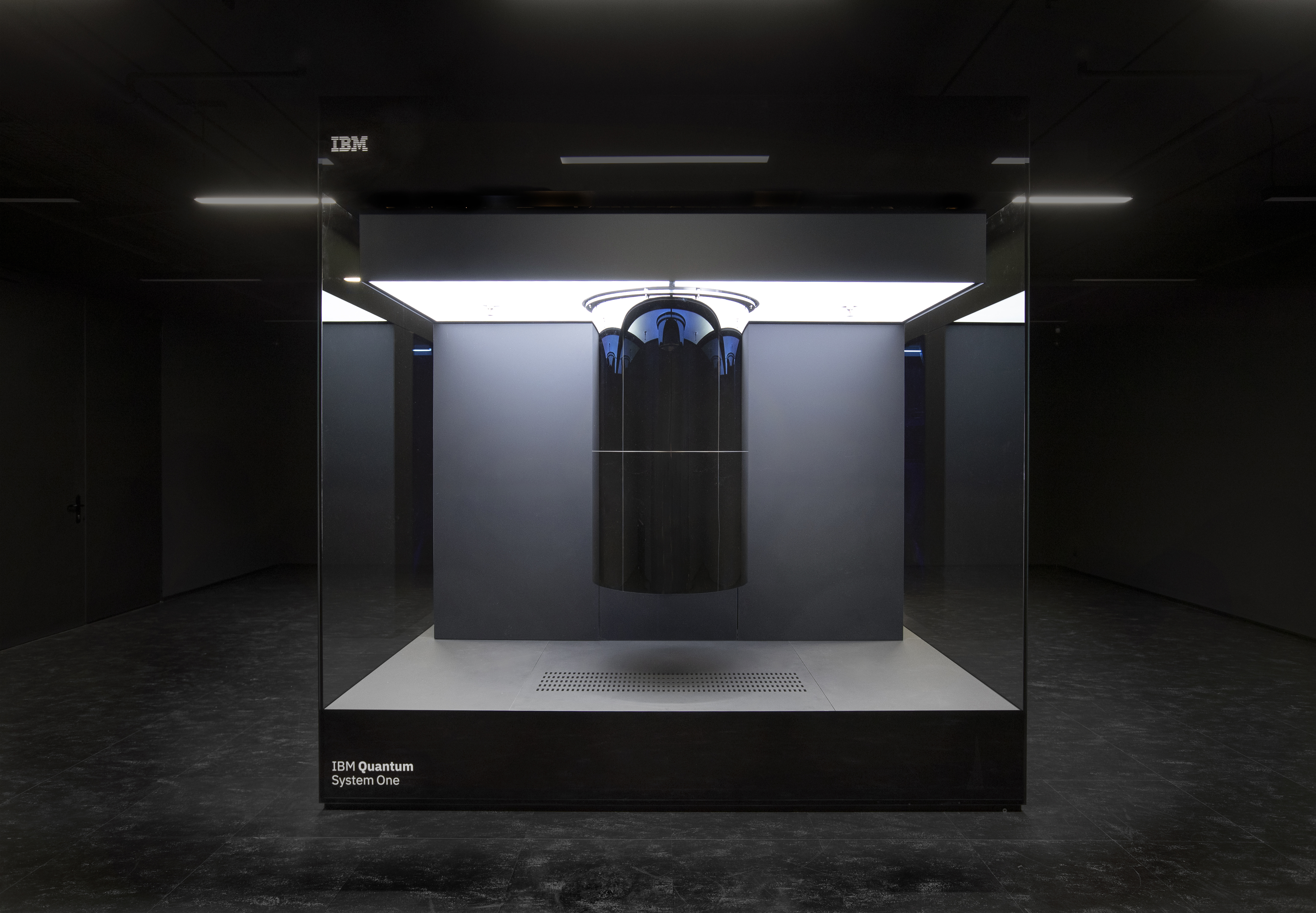
- IBM Quantum System from Ehningen, Germany
- Developer: IBM Research
- Manufacturer: IBM
- Type: Quantum computer
- Released: January 2019; 7 years ago
- Units shipped: 5 (4 in progress)
- Successor: IBM Quantum System Two
- Website: research.ibm.com/interactive/system-one/

IBM Quantum System One is the first circuit-based commercial quantum computer, introduced by IBM in January 2019.

This integrated quantum computing system is housed in an airtight borosilicate glass cube that maintains a controlled physical environment. Each face of the cube is 9 feet (2.7 m) wide and tall. A cylindrical protrusion from the center of the ceiling is a dilution refrigerator, containing a 20-qubit transmon quantum processor. It was tested for the first time in the summer of 2018, for two weeks, in Milan, Italy.

IBM Quantum System One was developed by IBM Research, with assistance from the Map Project Office and Universal Design Studio. CERN, ExxonMobil, Fermilab, Argonne National Laboratory, and Lawrence Berkeley National Laboratory are among the clients signed up to access the system remotely.

From April 6 to May 31, 2019, the Boston Museum of Science hosted an exhibit featuring a replica of the IBM Quantum System One. On June 15, 2021, IBM deployed the first unit of Quantum System One in Germany at its headquarters in Ehningen. On April 5, 2024, IBM unveiled a Quantum System One at the Rensselaer Polytechnic Institute, the first IBM quantum system on a university campus.

== See also ==
- IBM Eagle
- IBM Quantum Platform
- Timeline of quantum computing and communication
- IBM Q System Two
- Superconducting quantum computing
- Qiskit
