= IBM Q System Two =

First modular utility-scaled quantum computer system

IBM Quantum System Two
- Developer: IBM Research
- Manufacturer: IBM
- Type: Quantum computer
- Released: December 4, 2023; 2 years ago
- CPU: Heron
- Memory: 399 (qubits)
- Dimensions: 22 ft x 22 ft x 12 ft (including the glass structure)
- Predecessor: IBM Quantum System One
- Related: Supports Qiskit runtime
- Website: research.ibm.com/blog/quantum-roadmap-2033

IBM Quantum System Two is the first modular utility-scaled quantum computer system, unveiled by IBM on December 4, 2023.

It is a successor to the IBM Quantum System One.

It contains three IBM Quantum Heron processors, which can be scaled up due to the system's modularity, and later upgraded for newer quantum processing units.

For its maximum efficiency, it has to be cooled to a temperature of a few hundredths of degrees above absolute zero (10–20 mK), using dilution technology.

== Current usage ==
IBM has stated that their clients and partners are using their 100+ qubit systems to advance science.

== Future ==
IBM has stated that their quantum coupling technology will allow multiple Quantum System Two units to connect together, to create systems capable of running 100 million operations in a single quantum circuit, and later a billion operations, by 2033.
