= Nuclear magnetic resonance quantum computer =

Proposed spin-based quantum computer implementation

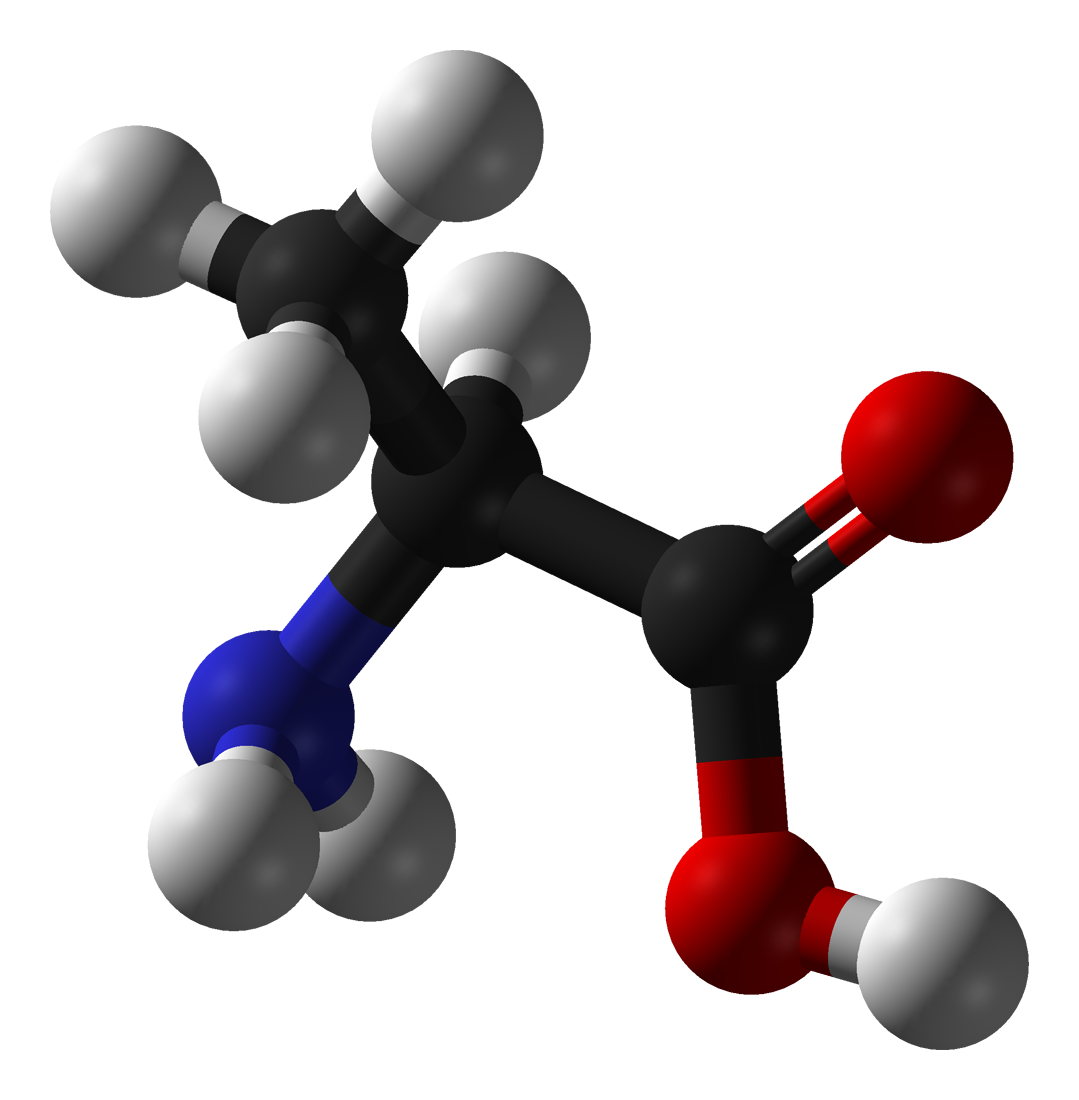
Molecule of alanine used in NMR implementation of quantum computing. Qubits are implemented by spin states of the black carbon atoms

Nuclear magnetic resonance quantum computing (NMRQC) is one of the several proposed approaches for constructing a quantum computer, that uses the spin states of nuclei within molecules as qubits. The quantum states are probed through the nuclear magnetic resonances, allowing the system to be implemented as a variation of nuclear magnetic resonance spectroscopy. NMR differs from other implementations of quantum computers in that it uses an ensemble of systems, in this case molecules, rather than a single pure state.

Initially the approach was to use the spin properties of atoms of particular molecules in a liquid sample as qubits - this is known as liquid state NMR (LSNMR). This approach has since been superseded by solid state NMR (SSNMR) as a means of quantum computation.

== Liquid state NMR ==
The ideal picture of liquid state NMR (LSNMR) quantum information processing (QIP) is based on a molecule in which some of its atom's nuclei behave as spin-1/2 systems. Depending on which nuclei we are considering they will have different energy levels and different interaction with its neighbours and so we can treat them as distinguishable qubits. In this system we tend to consider the inter-atomic bonds as the source of interactions between qubits and exploit these spin-spin interactions to perform 2-qubit gates such as CNOTs that are necessary for universal quantum computation. In addition to the spin-spin interactions native to the molecule an external magnetic field can be applied (in NMR laboratories) and these impose single qubit gates. By exploiting the fact that different spins will experience different local fields we have control over the individual spins.

The picture described above is far from realistic since we are treating a single molecule. NMR is performed on an ensemble of molecules, usually with as many as 10^15 molecules. This introduces complications to the model, one of which is introduction of decoherence. In particular we have the problem of an open quantum system interacting with a macroscopic number of particles near thermal equilibrium (~mK to ~300 K). This has led the development of decoherence suppression techniques that have spread to other disciplines such as trapped ions. The other significant issue with regards to working close to thermal equilibrium is the mixedness of the state. This required the introduction of ensemble quantum processing, whose principal limitation is that as we introduce more logical qubits into our system we require larger samples in order to attain discernable signals during measurement. Dimethylphosphite can be used for liquid NMR quantum computing providing 2 qubits, and Iodotrifluoroethylene can provide 3 qubits.

== Solid state NMR ==
Solid state NMR (SSNMR), unlike LSNMR uses a solid state sample, for example a nitrogen vacancy diamond lattice rather than a liquid sample. This has many advantages such as lack of molecular diffusion decoherence, lower temperatures can be achieved to the point of suppressing phonon decoherence and a greater variety of control operations that allow us to overcome one of the major problems of LSNMR that is initialisation. Moreover, as in a crystal structure we can localize precisely the qubits, we can measure each qubit individually, instead of having an ensemble measurement as in LSNMR.

== History ==
The use of nuclear spins for quantum computing was first discussed by Seth Lloyd and by David DiVincenzo in the early 1990s. Manipulation of nuclear spins for quantum computing using liquid state NMR was introduced independently by David G. Cory, Amr F. Fahmy and Timothy F. Have and independently by Neil Gershenfeld and Isaac Chuang in 1997. Some early success was obtained in performing quantum algorithms in NMR systems due to the relative maturity of NMR technology. For instance, in 2001 researchers at IBM reported the successful implementation of Shor's algorithm in a 7-qubit NMR quantum computer. However, even from the early days, it was recognized that NMR quantum computers would never be very useful due to the poor scaling of the signal-to-noise ratio in such systems. More recent work, particularly by Carlton M. Caves and others, shows that all experiments in liquid state bulk ensemble NMR quantum computing to date do not possess quantum entanglement, thought to be required for quantum computation. Hence NMR quantum computing experiments are likely to have been only classical simulations of a quantum computer.

== Mathematical representation ==
The ensemble is initialized to be the thermal equilibrium state (see quantum statistical mechanics). In mathematical parlance, this state is given by the density matrix:

$$\rho = \frac{e^{- \beta H}}{\operatorname{Tr}(e^{- \beta H})},$$

where H is the hamiltonian matrix of an individual molecule and

$$\beta = \frac{1}{k \, T}$$

where $k$ is the Boltzmann constant and $T$ the temperature. That the initial state in NMR quantum computing is in thermal equilibrium is one of the main differences compared to other quantum computing techniques, where they are initialized in a pure state. Nevertheless, suitable mixed states are capable of reflecting quantum dynamics which lead to Gershenfeld and Chuang to term them "pseudo-pure states".

Operations are performed on the ensemble through radio frequency (RF) pulses applied perpendicular to a strong, static magnetic field, created by a very large magnet. See nuclear magnetic resonance.

Consider applying a magnetic field along the z axis, fixing this as the principal quantization axis, on a liquid sample. The Hamiltonian for a single spin would be given by the Zeeman or chemical shift term:

$$H =  \mu B_z = I_z \omega$$

where $I_z$ is the operator for the z component of the nuclear angular momentum, and $\omega$ is the resonance frequency of the spin, which is proportional to the applied magnetic field.

Considering the molecules in the liquid sample to contain two spin-1/2 nuclei, the system Hamiltonian will have two chemical shift terms and a dipole coupling term:

$$H = \omega_1 I_{z1}+\omega_2 I_{z2}+2J_{12}I_{z1}I_{z2}$$

Control of a spin system can be realized by means of selective RF pulses applied perpendicular to the quantization axis. In the case of a two spin system as described above, we can distinguish two types of pulses: "soft" or spin-selective pulses, whose frequency range encompasses one of the resonant frequencies only, and therefore affects only that spin; and "hard" or nonselective pulses whose frequency range is broad enough to contain both resonant frequencies and therefore these pulses couple to both spins. For detailed examples of the effects of pulses on such a spin system, the reader is referred to Section 2 of work by Cory et al.

== See also ==
- Kane quantum computer
