= RQOPS =

Metric for a quantum computer's capabilities

Reliable Quantum Operations Per Second (rQOPS) is a metric that measures the capabilities and error rates of a quantum computer. It combines several key factors to measure how many reliable operations a computer can execute in a single second: logical error rates, clock speed, and number of reliable qubits.

The quantities included in rQOPS can be measured in all quantum computer architectures, allowing different architectures to be compared with one standard metric. A larger rQOPS measurement indicates a faster and more accurate device capable of solving more complex problems.

Microsoft suggest that a machine with 1 million rQOPS qualifies as a quantum supercomputer.

Alternative benchmarks include quantum volume, cross-entropy benchmarking, Circuit Layer Operations Per Second (CLOPS) proposed by IBM and IonQ's Algorithmic Qubits. However, as opposed to considering qubit performance alone, rQOPS measures how capable a quantum system is at solving tangible problems.

== Definition ==
rQOPS is calculated as rQOPS=Q x f, at a corresponding logical error rate pL., where Q is the number of logical qubits and f is the hardware's logical clock speed. Microsoft has selected this metric for the higher quantum computing implementation levels as it encompasses scale, speed, and reliability.

rQOPS =[Q][f]

== See also ==
- Noisy intermediate-scale quantum era
- Quantum error correction
- Threshold theorem
