= Algorithmic qubits =

Algorithmic Qubits (AQ) are an application based benchmark of quantum computers. Introduced by IonQ in 2020, the goal was to define a "single number figure of merit to evaluate the performance of quantum computers for solving a representative set of quantum algorithms." While other benchmarks such as IBM's Quantum volume are run on random quantum circuits that do not necessarily have practical applications, AQ is measured on specific algorithms which are known to have value by industry, such as those defined by the Quantum Economic Development Consortium.

== Definition ==
IonQ published code for calculating AQ in a Git code repository. The formal definition of calculating AQ is composed of several steps:

- Let the set of circuits in the benchmark suite be denoted by C.
- Locate each circuit c ∈ C as a point on the 2D plot by its Width, wc (Number of qubits), and Depth, dc (Number of Controlled NOT (CX) gates)
- Define success probability for a Quantum circuit c, F_{c}
  - The circuit passes if F_{c} - ϵ_{c} > t, where ϵ_{c} is the statistical error based on the number of shots, $\epsilon_c = \surd (F_c(q-F_c))/s_c$ where s_{c} is the number of runs, and t = 1/e = 0.37 is the threshold.
- Then, #AQ = N, where N=max$\{n:(F_c-\epsilon_c>t) \forall ((c \in C) \And (w_c\leq n) \And (d_c \leq n^2))\}$.

The data is usually shown graphically as a volumetric plot.

=== Algorithms used to define AQ 1.0 ===
Algorithm	Circuit width	Number of circuits per width
Quantum Fourier transform	>2	3
Quantum phase estimation algorithm	>3	3
Quantum amplitude estimation	>3	3
Monte Carlo sampling	>4	1
VQE simulation	Even numbers between 4–12	3
Hamiltonian simulation	Even numbers between 2–20	1

== Table of scores ==
Date	Company	Machine	AQ
March 2023	IonQ	Aria	20
March 2023	Quantinuum	H1	12
March 2023	IBM	Guadalupe	6
March 2023	Rigetti	Aspen-M1	5
September 2023	IonQ	Forte	29
March 2024	Quantinuum	H2-1	26
March 2024	IonQ	Forte	9
March 2024	Quantinuum	H2-1	32
March 2024	IonQ	Forte	29
December 2024	IonQ	Forte Enterprise	36
September 2025	IonQ	Tempo	64

== Limitations and criticisms ==
There are several known limitations of the benchmark. Error mitigation techniques can enhance the performance of quantum computers being tested. Specifically, certain mitigations do not scale well to the size of the computer can result with misleading results. Additionally, the restricted number of different circuits used during protocol affects the robustness of results.

The metric has been criticized as easy to manipulate. Quantinuum's Dr. Charlie Baldwin states "error mitigation, including plurality voting, may be a useful tool for some near-term quantum computing but it doesn’t work for every problem and it’s unlikely to be scalable to larger systems."
