= Jeremy Joyner White =

British Catholic educationist

Servant of God Jeremy Joyner White
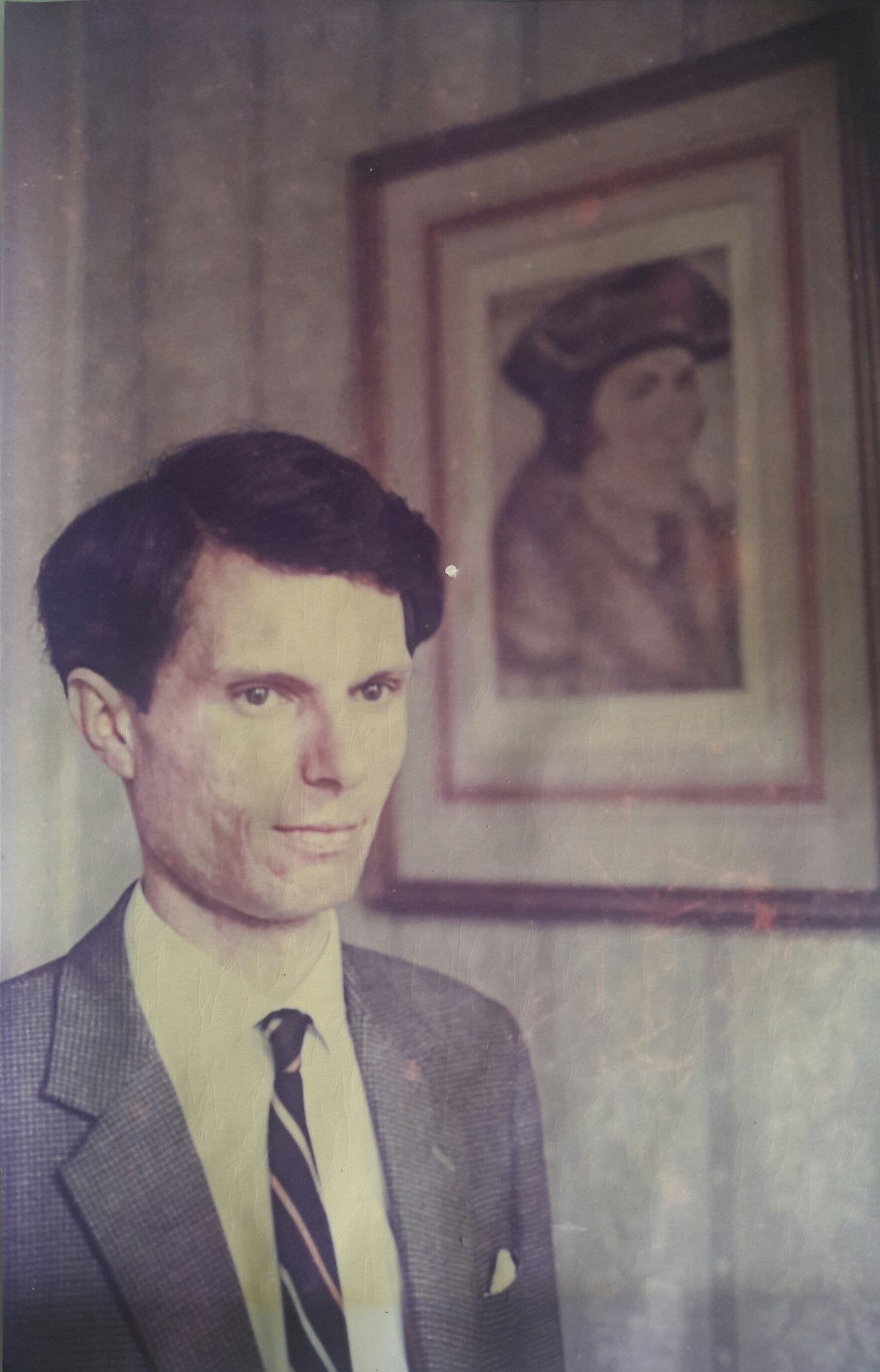
- Jeremy Joyner White (1938-1990)
- Born: 18 May 1938; Aldershot, Hampshire, England
- Died: 23 April 1990 (aged 51); Lagos, Nigeria

Jeremy Joyner White (18 May 1938 – 23 April 1990) was a British-Nigerian Catholic educationist. He is a candidate for beatification in the Catholic Church.

== Early life ==
Ikechukwu Obiaya, his biographer, states that "White was the only child of Francis W. J. White and Audrey Mary White. Francis W. J. White, of Irish origin, was a colonel in the British army and was stationed in Aldershot at the time. Audrey Mary White née Raymond, Jeremy's mother, was English, the daughter of an Anglican pastor. Both parents were practicing Anglicans and persons of deep faith as well as of great human and Christian virtues. They gave their son a good education, and it was in this home that Jeremy's natural virtues were formed. He learnt from them a sense of discipline, good human manners, the spirit of temperance and a firm faith in God."

Although White was born into an Anglican family, he converted to the Catholic faith in 1959 after studying Catholic doctrine at Netherhall House, a residence for students in London placed under the pastoral care of the Prelature of Opus Dei.

White's secondary education took place at Wellington College. He went on to study at Cambridge University where in 1959 he obtained a bachelor's degree in History and Modern Languages.

== Career ==
=== Kenya ===
In 1959, White went to Nairobi, Kenya, to join the foundational teaching staff of Strathmore College (now Strathmore School) – the first inter-racial college in Africa. On 20 October 1965, White arrived in Nigeria (from Kenya) to start, with others, the apostolic work of Opus Dei. Albert Alos recounts their arrival thus in his book: Sowing the Seed, Personal Memories of the First Ten Years of Opus Dei in Nigeria (1965–75):

"On Wednesday, 20th of October, 1965, Fr. Joseph and Jeremy took an Ethiopian Airlines’ plane in Nairobi that was coming from Dar es Salaam. From its incredible early beginnings in 1945, Ethiopian Airlines had enjoyed the highest prestige and reputation. Fr. Joseph and Jeremy were therefore surprised that the 7.30 am flight was announced to be delayed till 9 am.... They then flew to West Africa and landed in Lagos at 4 pm, where Fr. Joseph and Jeremy left the politicians behind en route to Accra. At the Lagos airport, there was neither a red carpet nor a musical band waiting for them. The airport was full of people, and they heard words in English and in all sorts of Nigerian dialects. They were happy to step on Nigerian soil.... Early in the morning of the 21st they took a taxi to St. Agnes Technical Teaching College where Fr. Joseph celebrated Holy Mass. The taxi driver decided to join Jeremy in attending Mass. From there, they took an 8:30 am flight to Ibadan..."

=== Nigeria ===
White and Gabiola were later joined by Gerard Gutiérrez (arriving April 1966), Louis Joachim Munoz (August 1966), Anthony Guillén Preckler (October 1966) and Albert Alos (October 1967) to start the Opus Dei in Nigeria. He obtained a doctorate degree in History in 1970 from Nigeria's premier university, the University of Ibadan.

His first employment in Nigeria was at the Institute of Administration, University of Ife (now Obafemi Awolowo University), as a lecturer and research fellow. In October 1973, he moved to Lagos having been appointed a lecturer at the Department of History, University of Lagos. White obtained Nigerian citizenship in 1985. White actively promoted several educational and developmental social projects in Nigeria. He was the pioneer Chairman of Educational Co-operation Society (ECS), a registered Nigerian educational charity.

On the registration of ECS, Alos states that:

“White made several visits and had to wait for hours on end swinging files from desk to desk at the Ministry of Trade. Jeremy’s patience was exemplary. Knowing that he would have to spend time in waiting rooms, he always took a book of philosophy or history to read… On 3 March 1974, Jeremy had an interview with the Attorney General of the Federation (AGF). This statutory interview was one of the last steps in the process which during which Jeremy had to defend the aims and purposes of ECS. The journey of the incorporation ended on 21 August 1974 with the registration of ECS”

ECS with White as chairman saw to the development and building of Helmbridge Study Centre, Lagos; Irawo University Centre, Ibadan and Iroto Rural Development Centre, Ijebu Ode. White's ECS inspired the gestation of Lagos Business School through the Centre for Professional Communications (CPC) which ran courses for professional men in Helmbridge Study Centre. Alos explains, "these apparently innocuous seminars for professionals were planned solely as a means of professional development. However, it became evident that such a high level of interest in these seminars pointed at a need for management education at a higher level. It would take some years for this germinating interest to mature into LBS".

== Death and legacy ==
White died in Lagos on 23 April 1990, aged 51, following a brief illness. At the time of his death, he was an associate professor at the University of Lagos.

White's biographer, Ikechukwu Obiaya, comments that White's life was outstanding in spite of ordinary: "Writing the biography of Jeremy Joyner White has involved for me a process of moving from a handshake to engaging in an arm-wrestle, albeit a gentle one, with Jeremy. The handshake began with trying to respond to the obvious first question: “Who was Jeremy?” Although I had heard quite a bit about Jeremy, I never met him. My discovery of him, therefore, took place through the eyes and experiences of others, and what was most striking was the very high esteem in which everyone seemed to hold Jeremy. He came across as a gentleman, a scholar engaged in the same profession as I. All the accounts presented him as an uncomplicated person, kind and easy going, hardworking and dedicated. However, there was nothing dramatic about Jeremy; his life did not contain any of the extraordinary escapades that the bards have put to song about the exalted characters of history. In trying to answer the question of what was special about Jeremy, his very ordinariness stood out. This was where my arm-wrestling with Jeremy began."

Tunde Agiri, Whites' colleague in the Department of History at the University of Lagos, states: "[White] was a Christian Humanist – the Opus Dei – who practiced the tenets of his Christian faith in daily living. He devoted his leisure to the improvement of the quality of life of those around him...intellectually, morally and spiritually. Indeed, it is in these respects that I believe White had made his greatest contribution to mankind. It is the legacy he has left for us all."

=== Veneration ===
White's cause for canonization in the Catholic Church was opened after his death and he is thus titled "Servant of God."

== Publications ==
- Central administration in Nigeria, 1914–1960 : the problem of polarity
- A Humean Critique of David Hume's Theory of Knowledge
