= List of adiabatic concepts =

Adiabatic (from Gr. ἀ negative + διάβασις passage; transference) refers to any process that occurs without heat transfer. This concept is used in many areas of physics and engineering. Notable examples are listed below.

== Automobiles ==
- Engine braking, a feature of some diesel engines, uses adiabatic expansion to diminish the vehicle's forward momentum.

== Meteorology ==
- Adiabatic lapse rate, the change in air temperature with changing height, resulting from pressure change.

== Quantum chemistry ==
- Adiabatic invariant Born–Oppenheimer approximation

== Thermodynamics ==
- Adiabatic process
- Adiabatic ionization
- Adiabatic index
- Adiabatic accessibility

== Quantum mechanics ==
- Adiabatic theorem
- Adiabatic quantum motor

== Electronics ==
- Adiabatic circuit
- Adiabatic logic
