= Ilyas Khan =

British technologist and businessman

Ilyas Khan KSG (born 1962) is a British technologist and billionaire businessman. He is the founder and vice chairman of one of the world’s leading quantum computing companies Cambridge Quantum Computing, now known as Quantinuum, which he established in 2014. He is also a founding shareholder and Chairman of advanced semiconductor company Fortaegis Technologies.

== Early life ==
Ilyas Tariq Khan was raised in Lancashire, England. His grandparents emigrated to Britain in the 1930s. His early schooling was in the old Lancashire Pennine mill towns of Haslingden, at Haslingden Grammar School, and then Accrington.

When Khan was at the University of London’s School of Oriental and African Studies, he stayed at Netherhall House, an Opus Dei student hall of residence. Although he was born a Muslim whilst at Netherhall House he became interested in Catholicism and especially the work of 20th century theologian Hans Urs von Balthasar and of John Henry Newman.

== Career ==
Khan is a merchant banker by training and started his career at the London firm of J. Henry Schroder Wagg & Co. Ltd.

In 2009, Khan acquired the English football team Accrington Stanley, preventing it from going into bankruptcy. He is the founder and publisher of the Asia Literary Review.

Khan remains the non executive senior partner of Stanhill Capital Partners, a merchant banking business with a focus on natural resources which he founded in 1998, during the 20 years (1989–2009) he spent living and working in Hong Kong. He was also one of the founding directors of Australia-based White Energy Company.

Khan has published on the subject of Quantum Information Processing, and in 2014 he founded Cambridge Quantum Computing, which builds tools for the commercialisation of quantum technologies with a focus on quantum software and quantum cybersecurity. In December 2021 Cambridge Quantum Computing merged with Honeywell Quantum Solutions to form Quantinuum one of the world’s leading quantum computing companies, and Khan remained as CEO. Khan is the largest shareholder after Honeywell. In 2023 Khan became Vice-Chairman and Chief Product Officer of Quantinuum.

He was closely associated with St Edmund's College, Cambridge and also Judge Business School, where he was the "Leader in Residence". His special interests include philanthropy and Wittgenstein, and he is a member of the British Wittgenstein Society.

Khan has lectured and published papers on Ludwig Wittgenstein, among other subjects.

In June 2026, Quantinuum listed on the US Nasdaq stock exchange, with a market valuation of $16 billion. It was reported that at the time Khan remained the largest individual shareholder holding 15% of the company's equity, valuing his shareholding at over $2 billion.

== Philanthropy ==
Between 2015–2018 Khan served as chairman of the Stephen Hawking Foundation, which was established on the initiative of Professor Stephen Hawking to further the study of Cosmology, Astrophysics and Fundamental Particle Physics and to facilitate research into Motor Neuron Disease / Amyotrophic Lateral Sclerosis (MND/ALS).

Khan served two terms as the chairman of the prominent British charity Leonard Cheshire Disability (LCD) — the largest organization of its kind in the world, with a presence in over 50 countries.

Khan is the founding chairman of Topos Institute, a non-profit research institute devoted to shaping technology for public benefit by advancing sciences of connection and integration.

Khan is a patron of the Christian Heritage Centre at Stonyhurst, which aims to make the collections and resources at Stonyhurst College more widely accessible. The project has the support of Lord and Lady Nicholas Windsor, Lord Guthrie, and Lord David Alton.

== Personal life ==
He is married to Mara Hotung Khan.

=== Religion ===
In September 2015, Pope Francis elevated Khan to a Knight of the Order of St Gregory the Great for his contribution to the Church and community.

In 2015, Khan ranked 21st in The Tablet's list of Britain's most influential lay Catholics.

Khan is listed in the Catholic Herald 'Catholics of Today', profiling leading Catholics in a wide range of spheres and industries.
