= Michael D. Hurley =

British university teacher (born 1976)

- Education: University of Cambridge; University of St Andrews; Stonyhurst College
- Website: michaeldhurley.com

Michael D. Hurley (born 1976) is Professor of Literature and Theology at the University of Cambridge, and a Fellow and Director of Studies in English at Trinity College, Cambridge. He was educated at the universities of Cambridge and St Andrews, and at Stonyhurst College. Hurley has published books and articles on literary form and style, and on the interrelations of literature, philosophy and theology. Concurrent with his academic position at Cambridge, he has been awarded visiting positions at Harvard and All Souls College, Oxford. Hurley is co-editor of The Hopkins Quarterly, a journal of critical, scholarly and appreciative responses to the lives and works of Gerard Manley Hopkins and his circle. He is also Chairman of The Christian Heritage Centre at Stonyhurst, and frequently gives talks and public lectures on the philosophical and theological questions posed by art and literature. In 2022, Hurley was profiled by the Catholic Herald as one of the “UK Catholic leaders of today”.

== Publications ==
- Thinking Through Style: Non-Fiction Prose of the Long Nineteenth Century (2018). Co-edited with Marcus Waithe. Oxford University Press. ISBN 978-0198737827
- Faith in Poetry: Verse Style as a Mode of Religious Belief (2017). Bloomsbury. ISBN 978-1474234078
- G. K. Chesterton (2012). Northcote House/British Council. ISBN 978-0746312100
- Poetic Form: An Introduction (2012). Co-authored with Michael O'Neill. Cambridge University Press. ISBN 978-0321198204
- The Complete Father Brown Stories (2012). Edited and Introduced. Penguin Classics. ISBN 978-0141193854
