= HQS =

HQS may refer to:

- HQS, abbreviation for headquarters ship, type of naval vessel
- Honeywell Quantum Solutions, company merged to create Quantinuum
- Housing Quality Standards, process used in home inspection
