= XEB =

XEB may refer to:

- Cross-entropy benchmarking, a benchmarking method for quantum computing
- XEB-AM, a radio station
- XEB, a band formed by Kevin Cadogan and other members of Third Eye Blind
