= Quantum catalyst =

In quantum information theory, a quantum catalyst is a special ancillary quantum state whose presence enables certain local transformations that would otherwise be impossible. Quantum catalytic behaviour has been shown to arise from the phenomenon of catalytic majorization.

The catalytic majorization relation can be used to find which transformations of jointly held pure quantum states are possible via local operations and classical communication (LOCC); particularly when an additional jointly held state is optionally specified to facilitate the transformation without being consumed. In the process sometimes referred to as entanglement catalysis, the catalyst can be understood as that temporarily involved entangled state. For bipartite pure entangled states that can be transformed in this way with unit probability, the respective Schmidt coefficients are said to satisfy the trumping relation, a mathematical relation which is an extension of the majorization relation. If correlations between the system and the catalyst are allowed, catalytic transformations between bipartite pure states are characterized via the entanglement entropy. Others have shown how quantum catalytic behaviour arises under a probabilistic approach via stochastic dominance with respect to the convolution of measures.
