= Circuit Layer Operations per Second =

Circuit Layer Operations per Second (CLOPS) is a benchmarking metric of quantum computers developed by IBM in 2021. While Quantum volume is more indicative of a qubit's performance and quality, CLOPS is a measure of a quantum computer’s execution speed. CLOPS incorporates both the time to run a circuit as well as the real-time and near-time classical computation, enabling it to serve as a holistic single measure of speed. CLOPS in conjunction with the number of qubits and the quantum volume was originally envisioned by IBM to be the 3 core metrics for comparing quantum devices.

== Redefinition ==
Originally CLOPS was designed to be related to quantum volume, in the sense that each circuit layer was idealized square quantum volume circuits. However, in 2023 IBM created a new definition of CLOPS which is related to a specific hardware layer. The different versions are differentiated with a subscript: CLOPS_{v} for virtual and CLOPS_{h} for hardware. Functionally, the core difference is that instead of using quantum volume in the calculation, a different metric known as layer fidelity is used instead, measured by the error per layered gate (ELPG) protocol. This enables different hardware with different quantum volumes to be more accurately compared.

== Mathematical explanation of the benchmark ==
- Define M template circuits; each one composed of K different quantum circuits
- S is the number of shots to run
- D is the quantum volume as log_{2}
- T is the total amount of time in seconds taken for execution, including the data transfer, transpilation, measurements, resets, and delays

CLOPS_{v} = $\bigl(M*K*S*D\bigr)\over T$

The main update in CLOPS_{h} was to replace the quantum volume metric D above with the something IBM termed the layer fidelity, which according to IBM "provides a benchmark that encapsulates the entire processor’s ability to run circuits while revealing information about individual qubits, gates, and crosstalk." Layer fidelity is measured by the error per layered gate (EPLG). This inflates the CLOPS score for quantum computers that are sparsely connected.

== Table of measured CLOPS ==
Date	Company	QPU	Architecture	CLOPS_{v}	CLOPS_{h}
October 2021	IBM	Bogota	Superconducting	1419	
October 2021	IBM	Toronto	Superconducting	951	
October 2021	IBM	Brooklyn	Superconducting	753	
August 2023	Qutech	Starmon-5	Superconducting	372	
August 2024	IQM Quantum Computers	Garnet	Superconducting	2600	
February 2025	IBM	Heron r2	Superconducting	2400	195000
February 2025	IBM	Heron r1	Superconducting	2400	210000
