= Christopher Monroe =

American physicist

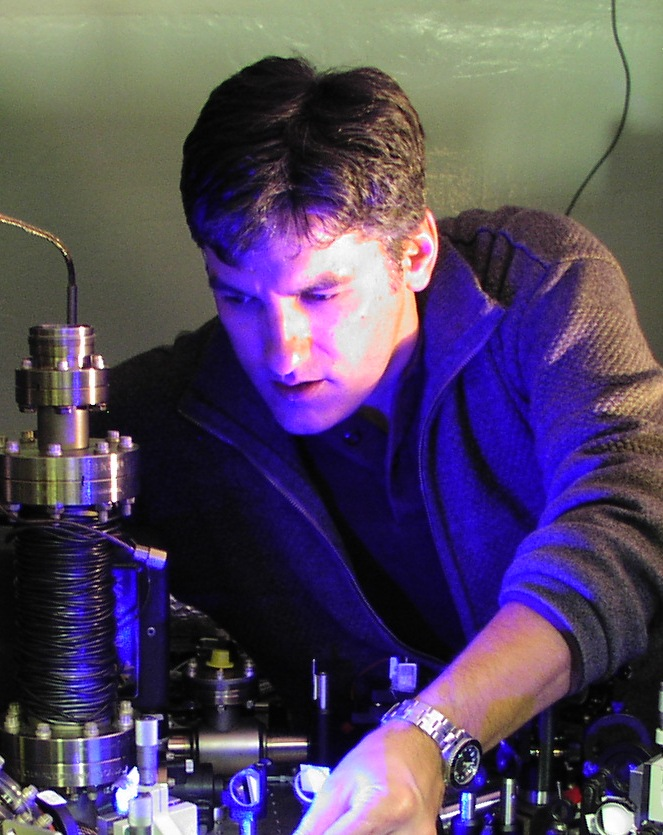
- Born: October 19, 1965 (age 61); Southfield, Michigan, U.S.
- Education: MIT; University of Colorado Boulder
- Known for: Quantum Information; Ion Trapping
- Awards: I. I. Rabi Prize; International Quantum Communication Award; Presidential Early Career Award for Scientists and Engineers; Arthur L. Schawlow Prize in Laser Science
- Scientific career
- Fields: Physics; Quantum Information Science; Atomic Physics
- Workplaces: Duke University; University of Michigan; University of Maryland; National Institute of Standards and Technology
- Doctoral advisor: Carl Wieman

Christopher Roy Monroe (born October 19, 1965) is an American physicist and engineer in the areas of atomic, molecular, and optical physics and quantum information science, especially quantum computing. He directs one of the leading research and development efforts in ion trap quantum computing. Monroe is the Gilhuly Family Presidential Distinguished Professor of Electrical and Computer Engineering and Physics at Duke University and was College Park Professor of Physics at the University of Maryland and Fellow of the Joint Quantum Institute and Joint Center for Quantum Computer Science until 2020 when he moved to Duke. He is also co-founder of IonQ, Inc.

== Career ==
After receiving his undergraduate degree from Massachusetts Institute of Technology in 1987, Monroe joined Carl Wieman's research group at the University of Colorado Boulder in the early days of laser cooling and trapping of atoms. With Wieman and postdoctoral researcher Eric Cornell, Monroe contributed to the path for cooling a gas of atoms to the Bose-Einstein condensation phase transition. He obtained his PhD under Wieman in 1992 (Wieman and Cornell succeeded in the quest in 1995, and were awarded the Nobel Prize for this work in 2001).

From 1992 to 2000, Monroe worked in the Ion Storage Group of David Wineland at the National Institute of Standards and Technology in Boulder, CO, where he was awarded a National Research Council postdoctoral fellowship from 1992-1994, and held a staff position in the same group from 1994-2000. With Wineland, Monroe led the research team that demonstrated the first quantum logic gate in 1995 and for the first time entangled multiple qubits, and exploited the use of trapped atomic ions for applications in quantum control and the new field of quantum information science.

In 2000, Monroe initiated a research group at the University of Michigan, Ann Arbor, where he showed how qubit memories could be linked to single photons for quantum networking. There he also demonstrated the first ion trap integrated on a semiconductor chip. With Wineland, Monroe proposed a scalable quantum computer architecture based on shuttling atomic ions through complex ion trap chips. In 2006, Monroe became director of the FOCUS Center at the University of Michigan, a NSF Physics Frontier Center in the area of ultrafast optical science.

In 2007, Monroe became the Bice Zorn Professor of Physics at the University of Maryland and a Fellow of the Joint Quantum Institute between the University of Maryland and the National Institute of Standards and Technology (NIST). There, Monroe's group produced quantum entanglement between two widely separated atoms, and were the first to teleport quantum information between matter separated over distance. They exploited this resource for a number of quantum communication protocols and for a new hybrid memory/photon quantum computer architecture. In recent years, his group pioneered the use of individual atoms as a quantum simulator, or a special purpose quantum computer that can probe complex many-body quantum phenomena such as frustration and magnetic ordering. His laboratory controls and manipulates the largest collection of individual interacting qubits.

In 2015, Monroe co-founded the startup IonQ, Inc. with Jungsang Kim (Duke University), and until 2023 was chief scientist. From August 2018 to May 2019 he was CEO. IonQ manufactures full stack quantum computers based on trapped atomic ion technology.

Monroe was elected to the National Academy of Sciences in 2016. In 2017-2018 he played an instrumental role in working with the National Photonics Initiative and U.S. Congress to craft the 2018 National Quantum Initiative Act, endowing U.S. scientific agencies to coordinate research in quantum information science and technology, while standing up focused research centers throughout the country.

In 2021, Monroe became the Gilhuly Family Presidential Distinguished Professor at Duke University, in the Departments of Physics and Electrical and Computer Engineering. He is the founding director of the Duke Quantum Center, an institute that designs, builds, and operates quantum computers.
