= IonQ =

US information technology company

IonQ, Inc.
- Type: Public
- Traded as: NYSE: IONQ
- Industry: Quantum computing
- Founded: 2015
- Founders: Christopher Monroe; Jungsang Kim
- Headquarters: College Park, Maryland, US
- Key people: Niccolo de Masi (Chairman and CEO)
- Products: Quantum computing and supporting technologies
- Revenue: $130 million (2025)
- Net income: $-510.4 million (2025)
- Total assets: $6.57 billion (2025)
- Total equity: $6.57 billion (2025)
- Number of employees: 1,132 (December 2025)
- Website: ionq.com

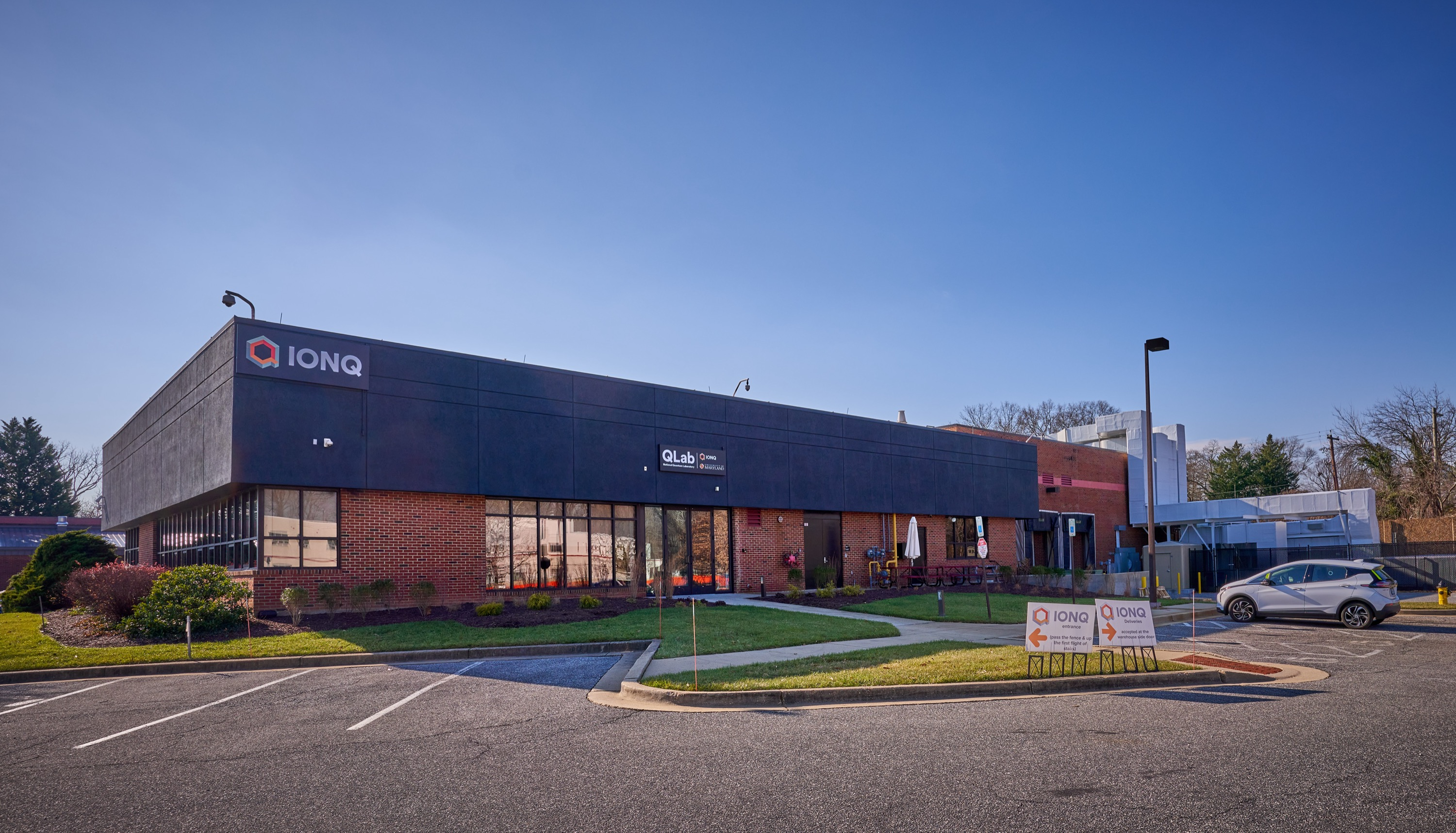
IonQ headquarters in College Park, Maryland

IonQ, Inc. is an American quantum computing hardware and software company headquartered in College Park, Maryland. The company develops general-purpose trapped ion quantum computers and accompanying software to generate, optimize, and execute quantum circuits.

== History ==
IonQ was co-founded by Christopher Monroe, at the time a professor at University of Maryland, and Jungsang Kim, a professor at Duke University, in 2015, with the help of venture firm New Enterprise Associates.

The company is an offshoot of the co-founders’ 25 years of academic research in quantum information science. Monroe's quantum computing research began as a Staff Researcher at the National Institute of Standards and Technology (NIST) with physicist David Wineland where he led a team using trapped ions to produce the first controllable qubits and the first controllable quantum logic gate, culminating in a proposed architecture for a large-scale trapped ion computer.

Kim and Monroe, who was at the time a professor at the University of Maryland, College Park (UMD), began collaborating formally as a result of larger research initiatives funded by the Intelligence Advanced Research Projects Activity (IARPA). They wrote a review paper for Science Magazine entitled Scaling the Ion Trap Quantum Processor, pairing Monroe's research at UMD in trapped ions with Kim's focus on scalable quantum information processing and quantum communication hardware.

This research partnership became the seed for IonQ's founding. In 2015, New Enterprise Associates invested $2 million to commercialize the technology Monroe and Kim proposed in their Science paper.

In 2016, they brought on David Moehring from IARPA—where he was in charge of several quantum computing initiatives—to be the company's chief executive. In 2017, they raised a $20 million series B, led by GV (formerly Google Ventures) and New Enterprise Associates, the first investment GV has made in quantum computing technology. They began hiring in earnest in 2017, with the intent to bring an offering to market by late 2018. In May 2019, former Amazon Prime executive Peter Chapman was named new CEO of the company. IonQ then partnered to make its quantum computers available to the public through Amazon Web Services, Microsoft Azure, and Google Cloud.

In October 2021, IonQ received $636 million when it went public on the New York Stock Exchange via a special-purpose acquisition company. The company opened a dedicated research and development facility in Bothell, Washington, in February 2024, touting it as the first quantum computing factory in the United States.

Niccolò de Masi became president and CEO of IonQ in February 2025, after being on the company's board since 2021. He succeeded Peter Chapman, who became executive chair. In August 2025, de Masi was appointed chairman.

In August 2026, IonQ's Space Division, previously known as Capella, secured a contract with the U.S. National Reconnaissance Office to provide services related to the NRO’s Radar Commercial Augmentation program.

== Leadership ==
=== Peter Chapman (2019–2025) ===
Peter Chapman was CEO of IonQ from May 2019 until February 2025.

Before joining IonQ, he was an engineering director at Amazon, overseeing a 260-person team responsible for the “delivery experience” for Amazon Prime. Chapman guided IonQ through its transition from a private research-driven company to a publicly traded quantum computing firm, following its 2021 merger with dMY Technology Group III. He was Executive Chair after stepping down as CEO in 2025 before stepping down from that role in the summer of 2025.

=== Niccolò de Masi (2025–present) ===
Niccolò de Masi succeeded Chapman as CEO in February 2025. A physicist by training with degrees from the University of Cambridge’s Cavendish Laboratory, de Masi has led multiple technology and consumer companies and was on more than a dozen public company boards. Early in his career, he was CEO of Monstermob Group PLC and Glu Mobile, where he oversaw significant growth through mobile gaming and hardware-software ecosystem strategies. He later co-founded dMY Technology Group, which completed several special-purpose acquisition company (SPAC) mergers, including IonQ’s 2021 public listing.

As CEO, de Masi has focused on expanding IonQ’s footprint in quantum networking and international markets. During his tenure, IonQ has completed several acquisitions. IonQ has also pursued global partnerships with organizations such as Japan’s National Institute of Advanced Industrial Science and Technology (AIST) and EPB in Chattanooga, Tennessee, while exploring future expansion through planned acquisitions of Oxford Ionics and Capella Space.

== Acquisitions ==
In November 2024, IonQ announced it would acquire Qubitekk, a U.S. firm focused on quantum networking technologies.

In May 2025, the company acquired a controlling stake in ID Quantique (IDQ), a Geneva-based firm specializing in quantum-safe cryptography and sensing technologies, adding hundreds of patents to IonQ's portfolio.

In June 2025, IonQ agreed to acquire British quantum computing startup, Oxford Ionics, for approximately $1.1 billion in IonQ stock. Also in June, IonQ completed the acquisition of Lightsynq Technologies, a US startup developing photonic interconnects and quantum memory, for 12.4 million shares of IonQ stock.

In July 2025, IonQ acquired satellite imaging company Capella Space, which had raised $320 million since it began in 2016, for $311 million of IonQ stock, with the aim of supporting plans for space-based quantum key distribution networks.

In September 2025, IonQ announced the acquisition of Vector Atomic, a California-based company specializing in quantum sensors for positioning, navigation, and timing applications.

In January 2026, IonQ agreed to buy SkyWater Technology for $1.8 billion. The acquisition was completed in July 2026.

== Technology ==
IonQ's hardware is based on a trapped ion architecture, from technology that Monroe developed at the University of Maryland, and that Kim developed at Duke.

In November 2017, IonQ presented a paper at the IEEE International Conference on Rebooting Computing describing their technology strategy and current progress. It outlines using a microfabricated ion trap and several optical and acousto-optical systems to cool, initialize, and calculate. They also describe a cloud API, custom language bindings, and quantum computing simulators that take advantage of their trapped ion system's complete connectivity.

IonQ and some experts claim that trapped ions could provide a number of benefits over other physical qubit types in several measures, such as accuracy, scalability, predictability, and coherence time. Others criticize the slow operational times and relative size of trapped ion hardware, claiming other qubit technologies are just as promising. IonQ measures performance of their devices by Algorithmic qubits, a metric devised in 2020 which accounts for both qubit quality and the overall quality of gate operations.

IonQ was selected by the Defense Advanced Research Projects Agency (DARPA) to participate in Stage B of the Quantum Benchmarking Initiative (QBI), joining ten other leading companies in the quantum computing industry. This selection follows IonQ’s successful completion of Stage A, which required participants to outline a path to developing utility-scale quantum computers. The QBI program seeks to assess whether a practical, industrially useful quantum computer can be realized by 2033.
