= Netherhall House =

Coordinates: 51°32′58″N 0°10′43″W

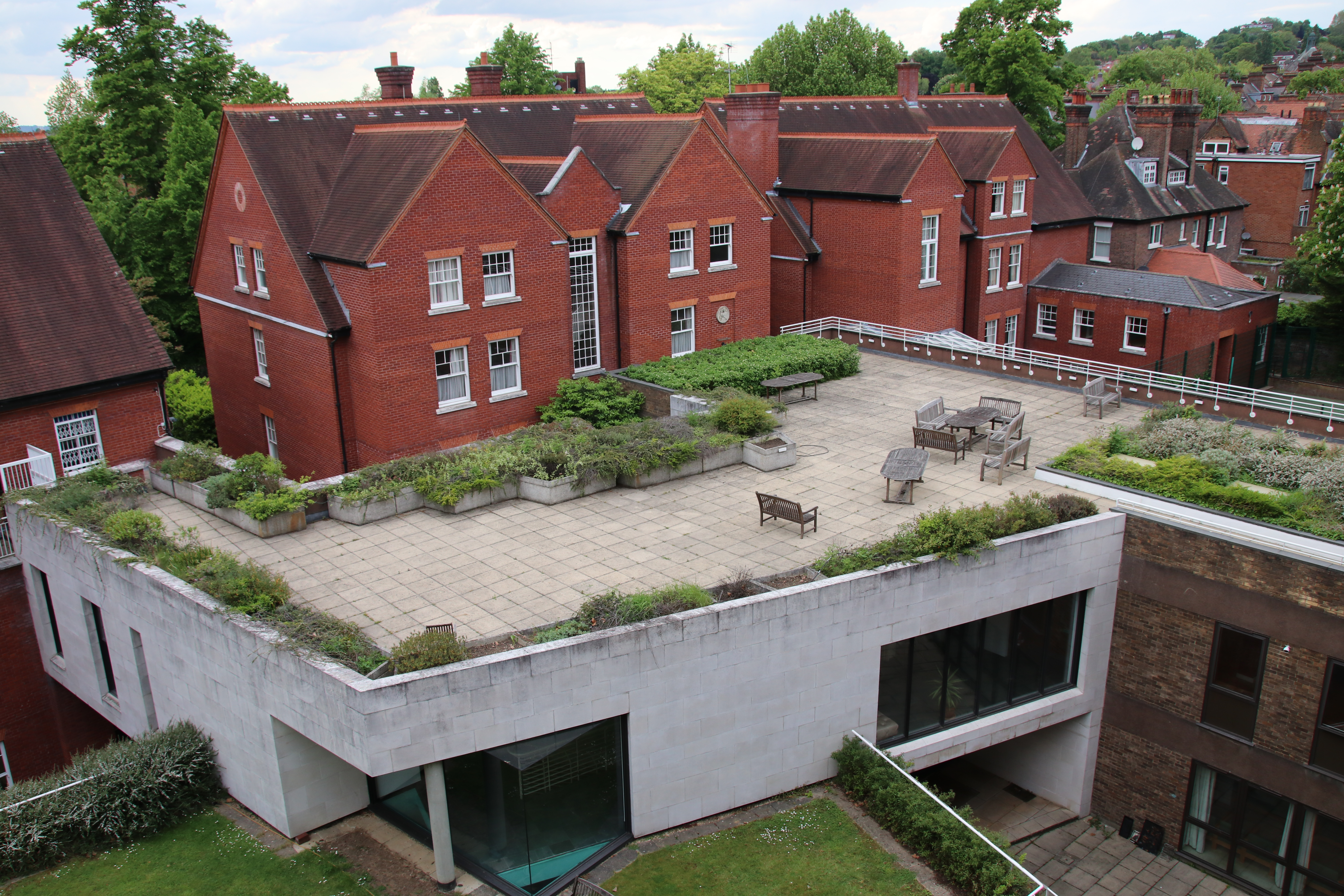
- Netherhall House (new wing and roof garden)

General information
- Type: Residential college for men
- Location: Hampstead, north London, England
- Current tenants: c. 60; capacity of c.100
- Opened: 1952

Website
- netherhall.org.uk

Netherhall House is a catered residential college for men, situated in Hampstead, London, England. It is less than a five-minute walk from Finchley Road tube station. Netherhall House was founded in 1952, in 1966 the 'old wing' was built and opened by the Queen Mother and in 1995 the 'new wing' was opened by Katharine, Duchess of Kent.

== Overview ==
Netherhall House is a corporate undertaking of Opus Dei, a personal prelature of the Catholic Church. It has a Chaplain who is also a member of the University of London chaplaincy. However, the college is open to students of all faiths and backgrounds. Netherhall has a large range of facilities; it has its own library, computer and laptop rooms, newspaper reading room, its own outdoor sports pitch used mainly for 5-a-side football and basketball, music practice rooms, a number of lounges and common rooms, an auditorium and a gym.

There are a variety of different activities on offer for residents, including a yearly play performed in the college's own auditorium. This auditorium is also used to stage free classical music concerts for residents and the general public each term, with performances from both residents as well as musicians from elsewhere. During term time there is also a regular guest speaker series featuring various individuals, all highly distinguished within their fields (List). A key social aspect of the house are the daily get-togethers following mealtimes. There is a curfew in place at midnight on weekdays and 2 am on weekends (which can be opted-out of on a given day, when needed).

== Residents ==
Netherhall has a varied group of Residents every year. The majority of residents are undergraduate students from different higher education institutions in London. There are also a number of postgraduate students every year, from both Masters and Doctoral programmes. In addition, a number of residents are young working professionals in a wide variety of industries. The college, with its auditorium and music practice facilities, usually attracts a number of music students and there is a public concert at least every term either performed or organised by the residents. The average resident of Netherhall House stays for more than one year, usually up to half of residents stay on from one year to the next.

== Staff ==
The Leadership team lives in the college and is available to help the students. Bedrooms are cleaned daily and the college is catered by the neighbouring Lakefield, a hospitality college that provides training in Cookery, Food & Drink Service and Housekeeping services.

== History ==
Existing Victorian buildings in Netherhall Gardens were in use from 1952. The first phase of new purpose-built accommodation was finished in 1966 and opened by Queen Elizabeth, the Queen Mother.

The Secretary-General of the Commonwealth, Chief Emeka Anyaoku laid a foundation stone for the second phase of modern building in 1993, and the completed project was inaugurated by the Duchess of Kent in 1995.

In June 2002 and again in September 2002, hundreds of residents and former residents attended celebrations at Netherhall marking the 50th anniversary of the opening of the House.

== Spiritual activities ==
Daily Mass is celebrated in the Oratory for those who wish to attend.

Other spiritual activities are organised such as seminars on Christian faith, retreats, and praying of the Rosary. All students are welcome to participate in these activities, whatever their creed, but are also totally free not to.

The college has a resident chaplain.

== Sports ==
On weekends there is football played on either Netherhall's own sports pitch or in the nearby Primrose hill. There is usually cricket on the weekends also and the sports pitch can be used for basketball. There is an annual 5-a-side football tournament open to teams from other student halls and residential colleges which is hosted to raise money for the Netherhall's charitable undertakings.

== Music and other activities ==
There are termly classical music concerts given by different residents of Netherhall House. There is also an annual Jazz concert and at least one rock concert a year. The college organises a few annual trips open to any residents. There is a yearly trip to Rome for Holy Week and also a 3-week 'work camp' where students go to a developing country and help a charitable undertaking. Recent trips have included going to Cambodia to build a small medical clinic, and going to Mae Sot to build a classroom for Burmese immigrants.

== Notable alumni ==
- Sükhbaataryn Batbold
- Sailosi Kepa
- Vanu Gopala Menon
- Ilyas Khan
