= Louis Joachim Munoz =

Spanish priest (1933–2013)

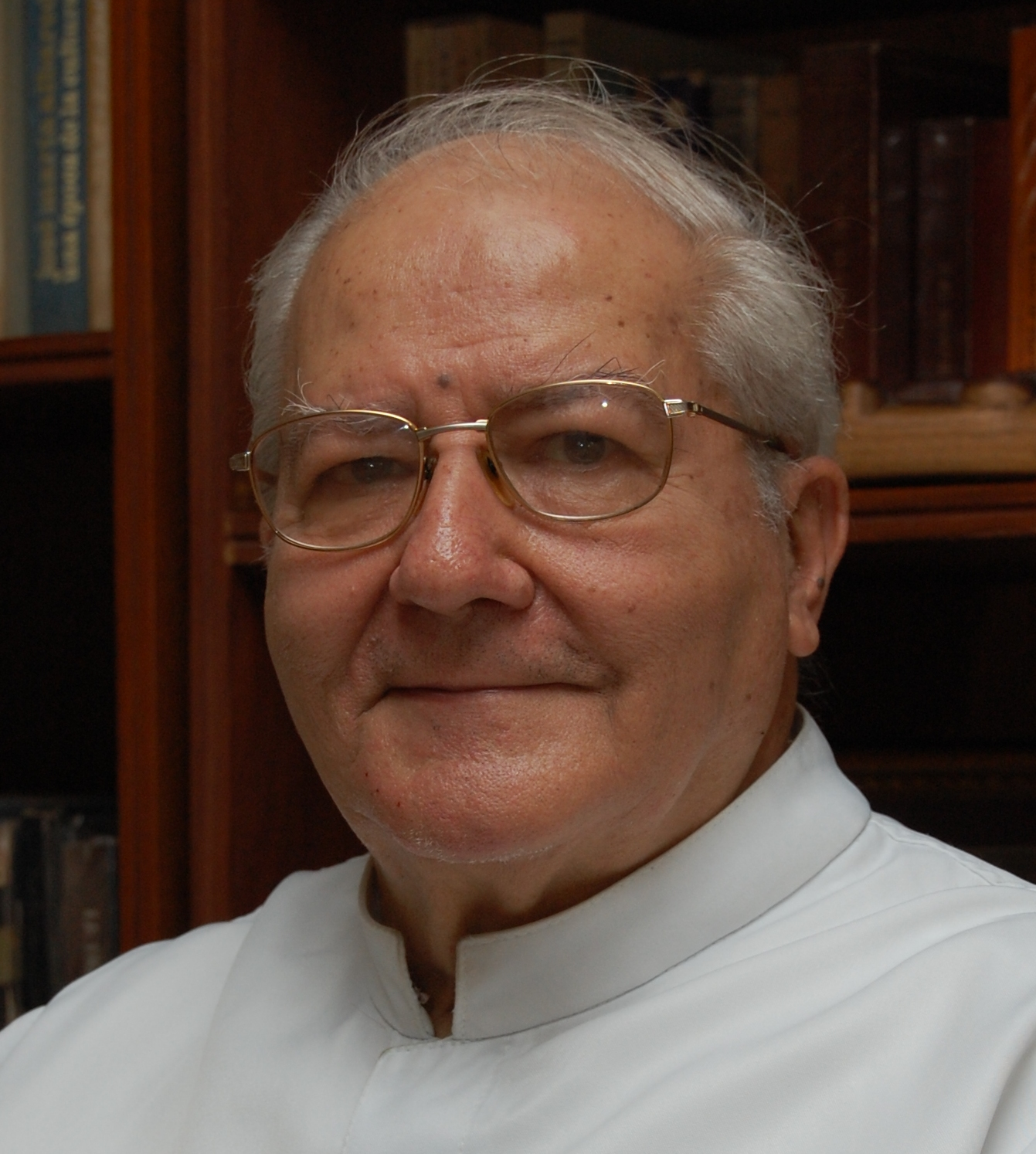
Rev. Fr. Professor Louis J. Munoz MFR

Louis Joachim Munoz, MFR (9 October 1933 – 19 March 2013) was a Spanish priest. He lived in Nigeria for 47 years where, alongside his duties as an Opus Dei priest, he lectured on political science and French.

== Early life ==
Munoz was born in Zamora, Spain. He studied law at University of Granada, where in his first year he became a member of Opus Dei. He graduated in 1958 with an LLM degree. Munoz then worked as a journalist for the Granada newspaper Patria.

He was ordained a Priest of the Personal Prelature of Opus Dei in Madrid, on 9 August 1959. In September, he went to the United States as a chaplain of Tremont House (Boston) where he resided until he was asked by St. Josemaria to go to Nigeria and help build Opus Dei, which had its beginnings there in 1965.

He lived in Ibadan, Nigeria, for 47 years and became a Nigerian citizen on 17 November 2006.

== Academic qualifications ==
- LL.M., University of Granada (Spain), 1958
- Ph.D. (summa cum laude) of Pontifical University of Saint Thomas Aquinas (Rome), 1957
- Ph.D. (summa cum laude) Political Science, Complutense University of Madrid, 1977

== Career ==
Fr Munoz was asked by St. Josemaría Escrivá, Founder of Opus Dei, to start the apostolic work of Opus Dei in Nigeria. He arrived on 22 August 1966 and spent the rest of his life there.

=== Teaching ===
Munoz started teaching in the University of Ibadan in 1967 and was appointed as a Professor of Political Science and French Studies in the department of European Studies, Faculty of Arts, University of Ibadan on 1 October 1980, working under Prof. Henry Evans. The main field of his research, the process of tradition, provided him with a synthesis and a comparative focus, which enabled him to write widely on political philosophy and on African and European history.

He retired in October 1998, but stayed on contract from 1999 to 2002, and thereafter taught and supervised graduate students in the department, gratis until his death.

=== Books ===
- The Past in the Present: Towards a Rehabilitation of Tradition (Spectrum, Ibadan: 2007)
- A Living Tradition: Studies in Yoruba Civilization (Bookcraft, Ibadan: 2003): Munoz, Louis J. (2004-02-01). A Living Tradition: Studies in Yoruba Civilization. Bookcraft, Nigeria. ISBN 9789782030719.
- Virtues: An Inquiry into Moral Virtues of our Times (Sefer, Ibadan: 1996) was Munoz's direct intervention during the political backwash of an annulled election in Nigeria. It was a series of seminars he gave to "university teachers, justices and others professional men."
- The Roots of the West: An Introduction to the European Cultural Tradition (Bookcraft, Ibadan: 2001)

=== Journal articles ===
Munoz published about 35 peer-reviewed journal articles, including:

- "The Dual Mandate of Modern Languages" (1976)
- "[The American Paradigm of Modernization] El paradigma americano de la modernización" (1977)
- "La Ciudad Ceremonial Yoruba, Mecanismo De Tradicion" (1978)
- "The Temporal Reference of Tradition" (1979)
- "The Rationality of Tradition" (1981)
- "Regionalism in Nigeria: The Transformation of Tradition" (1987)
- "Traditional Participation in a Modern Political System — the Case of Western Nigeria" (2008)
- "My Friendship with Emeritus Professor Jacob Ade-Ajayi" was his last work: a chapter in a Festschrift in honor of his friend, Emeritus Professor J. F. Ade Ajayi. Munoz "struggled to complete his chapter and died a few days after submitting it."

=== Pastor ===
Fr Munoz did not limit his work to research. He was involved in the spiritual and moral growth of the university community – teachers, students and other non-academic staff. He was the Parish Priest of the university chapel, Our Lady Seat of Wisdom, an assignment that he gladly received from the Catholic Archbishop of Ibadan.

As parish priest, Fr Munoz, celebrated liturgical services and dispensed communion and was involved extensively in individual counselling and offered classes on theology and Christian ethics. Together with other members of Opus Dei and their friends, he was instrumental in building the Irawo University Centre, a male hall of residence for university students. Moral and spiritual formation is entrusted to the Prelature of Opus Dei.

== Honours ==
Prof Munoz was a recipient of three national honours:

- France: Chevalier de l’Ordre des Palmes Académiques (1993)
- Spain: Cruz de Oficial de la Orden del Mérito Civil (1995)
- Nigeria: Member of the Order of the Federal Republic (MFR) (2005)
