= Toffoli gate =

Universal reversible logic gate, applied in quantum computing

In logic circuits, the Toffoli gate, also known as the CCNOT gate ("controlled-controlled-not"), invented by Tommaso Toffoli in 1980 is a CNOT gate with two control bits and one target bit. That is, the target bit (third bit) will be inverted if and only if the first and second bits are both 1. It is a universal reversible logic gate, which means that any classical reversible circuit can be constructed from Toffoli gates. There is also a quantum-computing version where the bits are replaced by qubits.

== Description ==
The truth table and permutation matrix are as follows (the permutation can be written (7,8) in cycle notation):

Truth table

Input			Output		
0	0	0	0	0	0
0	0	1	0	0	1
0	1	0	0	1	0
0	1	1	0	1	1
1	0	0	1	0	0
1	0	1	1	0	1
1	1	0	1	1	1
1	1	1	1	1	0

Permutation matrix

$$\begin{bmatrix}
1 & 0 & 0 & 0 & 0 & 0 & 0 & 0 \\
0 & 1 & 0 & 0 & 0 & 0 & 0 & 0 \\
0 & 0 & 1 & 0 & 0 & 0 & 0 & 0 \\
0 & 0 & 0 & 1 & 0 & 0 & 0 & 0 \\
0 & 0 & 0 & 0 & 1 & 0 & 0 & 0 \\
0 & 0 & 0 & 0 & 0 & 1 & 0 & 0 \\
0 & 0 & 0 & 0 & 0 & 0 & 0 & 1 \\
0 & 0 & 0 & 0 & 0 & 0 & 1 & 0 \\
\end{bmatrix}$$

== Background ==
An input-consuming logic gate L is reversible if it meets the following conditions: (1) L(x) = y is a gate where for any output y, there is a unique input x; (2) The gate L is reversible if there is a gate L´(y) = x which maps y to x, for all y.

An example of a reversible logic gate is a NOT, which can be described from its truth table below:

Input	Output	Condition (1)	Condition (2)
0	1	x = 0 y = 1	y = 1 x = 0
1	0	x = 1 y = 0	y = 0 x = 1

The common AND gate is not reversible, because the inputs 00, 01 and 10 are all mapped to the output 0.

Input	Output	Condition (1)
00	0	x not unique for y = 0
01	0	x not unique for y = 0
10	0	x not unique for y = 0
11	1	x = 11 y = 1

Reversible gates have been studied since the 1960s. The original motivation was that reversible gates dissipate less heat (or, in principle, no heat).

More recent motivation comes from quantum computing. In quantum mechanics the quantum state can evolve in two ways: by the Schrödinger equation (unitary transformations), or by their collapse. Logic operations for quantum computers, of which the Toffoli gate is an example, are unitary transformations and therefore evolve reversibly.

== Hardware description ==
The classical Toffoli gate implemented in the hardware description language Verilog:

module toffoli_gate (
 input u1, input u2, input in,
 output v1, output v2, output out);
always @(*) begin
    v1 = u1;
    v2 = u2;
    out = in ^ (u1 && u2);
end
endmodule

== Universality and Toffoli gate ==
Any reversible gate that consumes its inputs and allows all input computations must have no more input bits than output bits, by the pigeonhole principle. For one input bit, there are two possible reversible gates. One of them is NOT. The other is the identity gate, which maps its input to the output unchanged. For two input bits, the only non-trivial gate (up to symmetry) is the controlled NOT gate (CNOT), which XORs the first bit to the second bit and leaves the first bit unchanged.

Truth table

Input		Output	
0	0	0	0
0	1	0	1
1	0	1	1
1	1	1	0

Permutation matrix form

$$\begin{bmatrix}
1 & 0 & 0 & 0 \\
0 & 1 & 0 & 0 \\
0 & 0 & 0 & 1 \\
0 & 0 & 1 & 0 \\
\end{bmatrix}$$

Unfortunately, there are reversible functions that cannot be computed using just those gates. For example, AND cannot be achieved by those gates. In other words, the set consisting of NOT and XOR gates is not universal. To compute an arbitrary function using reversible gates, the Toffoli gate, proposed in 1980 by Toffoli, can indeed achieve the goal. It can be also described as mapping bits {a, b, c} to {a, b, c XOR (a AND b)}. This can also be understood as a modulo operation on bit c: {a, b, c} → {a, b, (c + ab) mod 2}, often written as {a, b, c} → {a, b, c ⨁ ab}.

The Toffoli gate is universal; this means that for any Boolean function f(x_{1}, x_{2}, ..., x_{m}), there is a circuit consisting of Toffoli gates that takes x_{1}, x_{2}, ..., x_{m} and some extra bits set to 0 or 1 to outputs x_{1}, x_{2}, ..., x_{m}, f(x_{1}, x_{2}, ..., x_{m}), and some extra bits (called garbage). A NOT gate, for example, can be constructed from a Toffoli gate by setting the three input bits to {a, 1, 1}, making the third output bit (1 XOR (a AND 1)) = NOT a; (a AND b) is the third output bit from {a, b, 0}. Essentially, this means that one can use Toffoli gates to build systems that will perform any desired Boolean function computation in a reversible manner.

== Related logic gates ==
The Fredkin gate

The Toffoli gate can be constructed from single qubit T- and Hadamard-gates, and a minimum of six CNOTs.

- The Fredkin gate is a universal reversible 3-bit gate that swaps the last two bits if the first bit is 1; a controlled-swap operation.
- The n-bit Toffoli gate is a generalization of the Toffoli gate. It takes n bits x_{1}, x_{2}, ..., x_{n} as inputs and outputs n bits. The first n − 1 output bits are just x_{1}, ..., x_{n−1}. The last output bit is (x_{1} AND ... AND x_{n−1}) XOR x_{n}.
- The Toffoli gate can be realized by five two-qubit quantum gates, but it can be shown that it is not possible using fewer than five.
- Another universal gate, the Deutsch gate, can be realized by five optical pulses with neutral atoms. The Deutsch gate is a universal gate for quantum computing.
- The Margolus gate (named after Norman Margolus), also called simplified Toffoli, is very similar to a Toffoli gate but with a −1 in the diagonal: RCCX = diag(1, 1, 1, 1, 1, −1, X). The Margolus gate is also universal for reversible circuits and acts very similar to a Toffoli gate, with the advantage that it can be constructed with about half of the CNOTs compared to the Toffoli gate.
- The iToffoli gate was implemented in superconducting qubits with pair-wise coupling by simultaneously applying noncommuting operations.
- A generalized Toffoli gate, sometimes called a multiple-control Toffoli (MCT) gate, uses more than two control bits, flipping the target bit only when all control bits are set to 1.

== Relation to quantum computing ==
Any reversible gate can be implemented on a quantum computer, and hence the Toffoli gate is also a quantum operator. However, the Toffoli gate cannot be used for universal quantum computation, though it does mean that a quantum computer can implement all possible classical computations. The Toffoli gate has to be implemented along with some inherently quantum gate(s) in order to be universal for quantum computation. Specifically any single-qubit gate with real coefficients that can create a nontrivial quantum state suffices.

A Toffoli gate based on quantum mechanics was successfully realized in January 2009 at the University of Innsbruck, Austria. While the implementation of an n-qubit Toffoli with circuit model requires $2n$ CNOT gates, the best known upper bound stands at $6n-12$ CNOT gates. It has been suggested that trapped Ion Quantum computers may be able to implement an n-qubit Toffoli gate directly. The application of many-body interaction could be used for direct operation of the gate in trapped ions, Rydberg atoms, and superconducting circuit implementations. Following the dark-state manifold, Khazali-Mølmer C_{n}-NOT gate operates with only three pulses, departing from the circuit model paradigm. The iToffoli gate was implemented in a single step using three superconducting qubits with pair-wise coupling.

== See also ==
- Controlled NOT gate
- Fredkin gate
- Reversible computing
- Bijection
- Uncomputation
- Quantum computing
- Quantum logic gate
- Quantum programming
- Adiabatic logic
