= Cross-entropy benchmarking =

Quantum benchmarking protocol

Cross-entropy benchmarking (XEB) is a statistical measure used to evaluate the performance in random circuit sampling experiments. It quantifies how strongly experimental samples correlate with the ideal output distribution and has been used in demonstrations of quantum supremacy.

== Definition ==
Let $C$ be an $n$-qubit quantum circuit. The output probability for bitstrings $x\in\{0,1\}^n$ for $C$ acting on all 0 input $0^n$ is $P(x)=|\langle x|C|0^n\rangle|^2$. Given $k$ samples $\{x_i\}_{i=1}^k$ obtained from an experimental device, the (linear) cross-entropy benchmarking fidelity is defined as

$$F_{\rm XEB}= 2^{n} \langle P(x_{i}) \rangle_{k} - 1 =  \frac{2^{n}}{k} \left(\sum_{i=1}^{k}|\langle 0^{n}|C|x_{i}\rangle|^{2}\right) - 1$$

== Interpretation ==
If $F_{XEB} = 1$, the samples were collected from a noiseless quantum computer. If $F_{\rm XEB} = 0$, then the samples could have been obtained via random guessing. This means that if a quantum computer did generate those samples, then the quantum computer is too noisy and thus has no chance of performing beyond-classical computations. Since it takes an exponential amount of resources to classically simulate a quantum circuit, there comes a point when the biggest supercomputer that runs the best classical algorithm for simulating quantum circuits can't compute the XEB. Crossing this point is known as achieving quantum supremacy; and after entering the quantum supremacy regime, XEB can only be estimated.

== Sampling-based quantum supremacy experiments ==
The Sycamore processor was the first to demonstrate quantum supremacy via XEB. Instances of random circuits with $n = 53$ and 20 cycles were run to obtain an XEB of $0.0024$. Generating samples took 200 seconds on the quantum processor when it would have taken 10,000 years on Summit at the time of the experiment. Improvements in classical algorithms have shortened the runtime to about a week on Sunway TaihuLight thus collapsing Sycamore's claim to quantum supremacy. As of 2021, the latest demonstration of quantum supremacy by Zuchongzhi 2.1 with $n = 60$, 24 cycles and an XEB of $0.000366$ holds. It takes around 4 hours to generate samples on Zuchongzhi 2.1 when it would take 10,000 years on Sunway.

== See also ==
- Boson sampling
