= Christian Heritage Centre at Stonyhurst =

The Christian Heritage Centre at Stonyhurst is a charitable trust that has as its mission the provision of access to, and learning around, Christian artefacts held at Stonyhurst College in Lancashire, England. Its royal patrons are Lord Nicholas Windsor and Lady Nicholas Windsor. Other patrons and trustees include: Cardinal Vincent Nichols, Cardinal Christoph Schonbörn, John Bruton, Ann Widdecombe, Baroness Caroline Cox, Field Marshal Lord Guthrie, and Lord Alton of Liverpool. The Centre has facilitated funding towards the restoration of the Old Chapel Museum and historic libraries in Stonyhurst College, which house a major collection of artefacts pertaining to the Roman Catholic community of Britain. The Centre has also funded the restoration of the previously derelict Water Mill, which the charity now operates under the name Theodore House, as an international residential centre for study and retreats. The house was opened by Lord Nicholas Windsor in February 2019 and is named for St. Theodore, the eighth Archbishop of Canterbury. The charity has also developed a Tolkien Trail and is developing a Hopkins Trail, commemorating two Christian writers who were inspired by the local Ribble Valley countryside.
