= Quantum circuit =

Model of quantum computing

Circuit that performs teleportation of a qubit. This circuit consists of both quantum gates and measurements. Measurement is a quantum phenomenon that does not occur in classical circuits.

In quantum information theory, a quantum circuit is a model for quantum computation, similar to classical circuits, in which a computation is a sequence of quantum gates, measurements, initializations of qubits to known values, and possibly other actions. The minimum set of actions that a circuit needs to be able to perform on the qubits to enable quantum computation is known as DiVincenzo's criteria.

Circuits are written such that the horizontal axis is time, starting at the left hand side and ending at the right. Horizontal lines are qubits, doubled lines represent classical bits. The items that are connected by these lines are operations performed on the qubits, such as measurements or gates. These lines define the sequence of events, and are usually not physical cables.

The graphical depiction of quantum circuit elements is described using a variant of the Penrose graphical notation. Richard Feynman used an early version of the quantum circuit notation in 1986.

== Reversible classical logic gates ==
Most elementary logic gates of a classical computer are not reversible. Thus, for instance, for an AND gate one cannot always recover the two input bits from the output bit; for example, if the output bit is 0, we cannot tell from this whether the input bits are 01 or 10 or 00.

However, reversible gates in classical computers are easily constructed for bit strings of any length; moreover, these are actually of practical interest, since irreversible gates must always increase physical entropy. A reversible gate is a reversible function on n-bit data that returns n-bit data, where an n-bit data is a string of bits x_{1},x_{2}, ...,x_{n} of length n. The set of n-bit data is the space {0,1}^{n}, which consists of 2^{n} strings of 0's and 1's.

More precisely: an n-bit reversible gate is a bijective mapping f from the set {0,1}^{n} of n-bit data onto itself. An example of such a reversible gate f is a mapping that applies a fixed permutation to its inputs. For reasons of practical engineering, one typically studies gates only for small values of n, e.g. n=1, n=2 or n=3. These gates can be easily described by tables.

== Quantum logic gates ==
The quantum logic gates are reversible unitary transformations on at least one qubit. Multiple qubits taken together are referred to as quantum registers. To define quantum gates, we first need to specify the quantum replacement of an n-bit datum. The quantized version of classical n-bit space {0,1}^{n} is the Hilbert space

$$H_{\operatorname{QB}(n)}= \ell^2(\{0,1\}^n).$$

This is by definition the space of complex-valued functions on {0,1}^{n} and is naturally an inner product space. $\ell^2$ means the function is a square-integrable function. This space can also be regarded as consisting of linear combinations, or superpositions, of classical bit strings. Note that H_{QB(n)} is a vector space over the complex numbers of dimension 2^{n}. The elements of this vector space are the possible state-vectors of n-qubit quantum registers.

Using Dirac ket notation, if x_{1},x_{2}, ...,x_{n} is a classical bit string, then

$$| x_1, x_2, \cdots,x_n \rangle \quad$$

is a special n-qubit register corresponding to the function which maps this classical bit string to 1 and maps all other bit strings to 0; these 2^{n} special n-qubit registers are called computational basis states. All n-qubit registers are complex linear combinations of these computational basis states.

Quantum logic gates, in contrast to classical logic gates, are always reversible. One requires a special kind of reversible function, namely a unitary mapping, that is, a linear transformation of a complex inner product space that preserves the Hermitian inner product. An n-qubit (reversible) quantum gate is a unitary mapping U from the space H_{QB(n)} of n-qubit registers onto itself.

Typically, we are only interested in gates for small values of n.

A reversible n-bit classical logic gate gives rise to a reversible n-bit quantum gate as follows: to each reversible n-bit logic gate f corresponds a quantum gate W_{f} defined as follows:

$$W_f( | x_1, x_2, \cdots,x_n \rangle) = |f(x_1, x_2, \cdots, x_n) \rangle.$$

Note that W_{f} permutes the computational basis states.

Of particular importance is the controlled NOT gate (also called CNOT gate) W_{CNOT} defined on a quantized 2 qubit. Other examples of quantum logic gates derived from classical ones are the Toffoli gate and the Fredkin gate.

However, the Hilbert-space structure of the qubits permits many quantum gates that are not induced by classical ones. For example, a relative phase shift is a 1 qubit gate given by multiplication by the phase shift operator:

$$P(\varphi) =\begin{bmatrix} 1 & 0 \\ 0 & e^{i\varphi} \end{bmatrix},$$

so

$$P(\varphi)| 0 \rangle =   | 0 \rangle \quad P(\varphi)| 1 \rangle = e^{i\varphi}| 1 \rangle.$$

== Reversible logic circuits ==
Again, we consider first reversible classical computation. Conceptually, there is no difference between a reversible n-bit circuit and a reversible n-bit logic gate: either one is just an invertible function on the space of n bit data. However, as mentioned in the previous section, for engineering reasons we would like to have a small number of simple reversible gates, that can be put together to assemble any reversible circuit.

To explain this assembly process, suppose we have a reversible n-bit gate f and a reversible m-bit gate g. Putting them together means producing a new circuit by connecting some set of k outputs of f to some set of k inputs of g as in the figure below. In that figure, n=5, k=3 and m=7. The resulting circuit is also reversible and operates on n+m−k bits.

We will refer to this scheme as a classical assemblage (This concept corresponds to a technical definition in Kitaev's pioneering paper cited below). In composing these reversible machines, it is important to ensure that the intermediate machines are also reversible. This condition assures that intermediate "garbage" is not created (the net physical effect would be to increase entropy, which is one of the motivations for going through this exercise).

Note that each horizontal line on the above picture represents either 0 or 1, not these probabilities. Since quantum computations are reversible, at each 'step' the number of lines must be the same number of input lines. Also, each input combination must be mapped to a single combination at each 'step'. This means that each intermediate combination in a quantum circuit is a bijective function of the input.

Now it is possible to show that the Toffoli gate is a universal gate. This means that given any reversible classical n-bit circuit h, we can construct a classical assemblage of Toffoli gates in the above manner to produce an (n+m)-bit circuit f such that

$$f(x_1, \ldots, x_n, \underbrace{0, \dots, 0}) = (y_1, \ldots, y_n, \underbrace{0, \ldots , 0})$$

where there are m underbraced zeroed inputs and

$$(y_1, \ldots, y_n) = h(x_1, \ldots, x_n)$$.

Notice that the result always has a string of m zeros as the ancilla bits. No "rubbish" is ever produced, and so this computation is indeed one that, in a physical sense, generates no entropy. This issue is carefully discussed in Kitaev's article.

More generally, any function f (bijective or not) can be simulated by a circuit of Toffoli gates. Obviously, if the mapping fails to be injective, at some point in the simulation (for example as the last step) some "garbage" has to be produced.

For quantum circuits a similar composition of qubit gates can be defined. That is, associated to any classical assemblage as above, we can produce a reversible quantum circuit when in place of f we have an n-qubit gate U and in place of g we have an m-qubit gate W. See illustration below:

The fact that connecting gates this way gives rise to a unitary mapping on n+m−k qubit space is easy to check. In a real quantum computer the physical connection between the gates is a major engineering challenge, since it is one of the places where decoherence may occur.

There are also universality theorems for certain sets of well-known gates; such a universality theorem exists, for instance, for the pair consisting of the single qubit phase gate U_{θ} mentioned above (for a suitable value of θ), together with the 2-qubit CNOT gate W_{CNOT}. However, the universality theorem for the quantum case is somewhat weaker than the one for the classical case; it asserts only that any reversible n-qubit circuit can be approximated arbitrarily well by circuits assembled from these two elementary gates. Note that there are uncountably many possible single qubit phase gates, one for every possible angle θ, so they cannot all be represented by a finite circuit constructed from {U_{θ}, W_{CNOT}}.

== Quantum computations ==
So far we have not shown how quantum circuits are used to perform computations. Since many important numerical problems reduce to computing a unitary transformation U on a finite-dimensional space (the celebrated discrete Fourier transform being a prime example), one might expect that some quantum circuit could be designed to carry out the transformation U. In principle, one needs only to prepare an n qubit state ψ as an appropriate superposition of computational basis states for the input and measure the output Uψ. Unfortunately, there are two problems with this:

- One cannot measure the phase of ψ at any computational basis state so there is no way of reading out the complete answer. This is in the nature of measurement in quantum mechanics.
- There is no way to efficiently prepare the input state ψ.

This does not prevent quantum circuits for the discrete Fourier transform from being used as intermediate steps in other quantum circuits, but the use is more subtle. In fact quantum computations are probabilistic.

We now provide a mathematical model for how quantum circuits can simulate probabilistic but classical computations. Consider an r-qubit circuit U with register space H_{QB(r)}. U is thus a unitary map

$$H_{\operatorname{QB}(r)} \rightarrow
H_{\operatorname{QB}(r)}.$$

In order to associate this circuit to a classical mapping on bitstrings, we specify

- An input register X = {0,1}^{m} of m (classical) bits.
- An output register Y = {0,1}^{n} of n (classical) bits.

The contents x = x_{1}, ..., x_{m} of the classical input register are used to initialize the qubit register in some way. Ideally, this would be done with the computational basis state

$$|\vec{x},0\rangle= | x_1, x_2, \cdots, x_{m}, \underbrace{0, \dots, 0} \rangle,$$

where there are r-m underbraced zeroed inputs. Nevertheless, this perfect initialization is completely unrealistic. Let us assume therefore that the initialization is a mixed state given by some density operator S which is near the idealized input in some appropriate metric, e.g.

$$\operatorname{Tr}\left(\big||\vec{x},0\rangle \langle \vec{x},0 | - S\big|\right) \leq \delta.$$

Similarly, the output register space is related to the qubit register, by a Y valued observable A. Note that observables in quantum mechanics are usually defined in terms of projection valued measures on R; if the variable happens to be discrete, the projection valued measure reduces to a family {E_{λ}} indexed on some parameter λ ranging over a countable set. Similarly, a Y valued observable, can be associated with a family of pairwise orthogonal projections {E_{y}} indexed by elements of Y. such that

$$I = \sum_{y \in Y} \operatorname{E}_y.$$

Given a mixed state S, there corresponds a probability measure on Y given by

$$\operatorname{Pr}\{y\} = \operatorname{Tr}(S \operatorname{E}_y ).$$

The function F:X → Y is computed by a circuit U:H_{QB(r)} → H_{QB(r)} to within ε if and only if for all bitstrings x of length m

$$\left\langle \vec{x},0 \big| U^* \operatorname{E}_{F(x)} U
\big|\vec{x},0 \right\rangle = \left\langle \operatorname{E}_{F(x)} U( |\vec{x},0\rangle) \big|  U( |\vec{x},0\rangle) \right\rangle \geq 1 - \epsilon.$$

Now

$$\left| \operatorname{Tr} (S U^* \operatorname{E}_{F(x)} U) - \left\langle \vec{x},0 \big| U^* \operatorname{E}_{F(x)} U
\big|\vec{x},0 \right\rangle\right|\leq \operatorname{Tr} (\big||\vec{x},0\rangle \langle \vec{x},0 | - S\big|) \| U^* \operatorname{E}_{F(x)} U \| \leq \delta$$

so that

$$\operatorname{Tr} (S U^* \operatorname{E}_{F(x)} U) \geq 1 - \epsilon - \delta.$$

Theorem. If ε + δ < 1/2, then the probability distribution

$$\operatorname{Pr}\{y\} = \operatorname{Tr} (S U^* \operatorname{E}_{y} U)$$

on Y can be used to determine F(x) with an arbitrarily small probability of error by majority sampling, for a sufficiently large sample size. Specifically, take k independent samples from the probability distribution Pr on Y and choose a value on which more than half of the samples agree. The probability that the value F(x) is sampled more than k/2 times is at least

$$1 - e^{- 2 \gamma^2 k},$$

where γ = 1/2 - ε - δ.

This follows by applying the Chernoff bound.

== See also ==
- Abstract index notation
- Angular momentum diagrams (quantum mechanics)
- Circuit complexity and BQP
- Matrix product state uses Penrose graphical notation
- Quantum register
- Spin networks
- Trace diagram
