= Schwinger boson representation =

Transformation in quantum mechanics

In quantum mechanics, the Schwinger boson representation maps quantum spin to bosonic fields. The theory was introduced by Julian Schwinger in 1952. The method is a special case for the more general Jordan–Schwinger map.

As opposed to the Holstein–Primakoff transformation, which only uses a single bosonic field the Schwinger boson theory uses two. The advantage of this representation is that the complicated square root terms of the Holstein–Primakoff transformation are avoided.

The Schwinger boson representation is often used to treat ferromagnetic, antiferromagnetic and frustrated spin systems in equilibrium and non-equilibrium conditions The representation is also used to describe states of atomic ensembles in quantum optics.

== Description ==
The three spin-operators $S_x$, $S_y$ and $S_z$ get mapped onto two different bosonic creation $a^\dagger,b^\dagger$ and annihilation operators $a,b$

$$\begin{align}
S_x&=\frac{1}{2}\left(a^\dagger b+ b^\dagger a\right)\\
S_y&=\frac{1}{2i}\left(a^\dagger b- b^\dagger a\right)\\
S_z&=\frac{1}{2}\left(a^\dagger a- b^\dagger b\right)\,.
\end{align}$$

It can be shown that the newly defined operators satisfy the spin algebra.

$$[S_i,S_j]=i\epsilon_{ijk}S_k$$

There is however a remaining issue, which is that the sizes of the Hilbert space do not match.

We thus need to enforce the following relation, which stops the space from being infinite dimensional (as it would be for standard bosons). Where $S$ is the total spin of the bosonized fermion.

$$a^\dagger a+b^\dagger b=2S$$

== See also ==
- Jordan–Wigner transformation
