= Neutrino theory of light =

The neutrino theory of light is the proposal that the photon is a composite particle formed of a neutrino–antineutrino pair. It is based on the idea that emission and absorption of a photon corresponds to the creation and annihilation of a particle–antiparticle pair. The neutrino theory of light is not currently accepted as part of mainstream physics, as according to the Standard Model the photon is an elementary particle, a gauge boson.

== History ==
In the past, many particles that were once thought to be elementary such as protons, neutrons, pions, and kaons have turned out to be composite particles. In 1932, Louis de Broglie suggested that the photon might be the combination of a neutrino and an antineutrino. During the 1930s there was great interest in the neutrino theory of light and Pascual Jordan, Ralph Kronig, Max Born, and others worked on the theory.

In 1938, Maurice Pryce brought work on the composite photon theory to a halt. He showed that the conditions imposed by Bose–Einstein commutation relations for the composite photon and the connection between its spin and polarization were incompatible. Pryce also pointed out other possible problems,

“In so far as the failure of the theory can be traced to any one cause it is fair to say that it lies in the fact that light waves are polarized transversely while neutrino ‘waves’ are polarized longitudinally,” and lack of rotational invariance. In 1966, V. S. Berezinskii reanalyzed Pryce's paper, giving a clearer picture of the problem that Pryce uncovered.

Starting in the 1960s, work on the neutrino theory of light resumed, and there continues to be some interest in recent years. Attempts have been made to solve the problem pointed out by Pryce, known as Pryce's theorem, and other problems with the composite photon theory. The incentive is seeing the natural way that many photon properties are generated from the theory and the knowledge that some problems exist with the current photon model. However, there is no experimental evidence that the photon has a composite structure.

Experimental results show that only left-handed neutrinos and right-handed antineutrinos exist. Three sets of neutrinos have been observed, one that is connected with electrons, one with muons, and one with tau leptons. There is convincing evidence that some neutrinos have mass. In experiments at the SuperKamiokande researchers have discovered neutrino oscillations in which one flavor of neutrino changed into another. It has been shown that the smallest of the three neutrinos could have mass = 0. Also, a massless photon could be formed with non-zero mass neutrinos inside the Einstein-Cartan torsion. Here, it is assumed that the composite photon is formed of a massless electron neutrino, $\nu_2$ and a massless electron antineutrino $\overline \nu_2$. The neutrino theory of light is not considered to be part of mainstream physics.

== Forming photon from neutrinos ==
It is possible to obtain transversely polarized photons from neutrinos.

=== The neutrino field ===
The neutrino field satisfies the Dirac equation with the mass set to zero,

$$\gamma^\mu p_\mu \Psi = 0.$$

The gamma matrices in the Weyl basis are:

$$\gamma^0 = \left( \begin{array}{cccc}
0 & 0 & 1 & 0 \\
0 & 0 & 0 & 1 \\
1 & 0 & 0 & 0 \\
0 & 1 & 0 & 0
\end{array} \right),
\; \; \; \; \gamma^1 = \left( \begin{array}{cccc}
0 & 0 & 0 & 1 \\
0 & 0 & 1 & 0 \\
0 & -1 & 0 & 0 \\
-1 & 0 & 0 & 0
\end{array} \right),$$

$$\gamma^2 = \left( \begin{array}{cccc}
0 & 0 & 0 & -i \\
0 & 0 & i & 0 \\
0 & i & 0 & 0 \\
-i & 0 & 0 & 0
\end{array} \right),
\; \; \; \; \gamma^3 = \left( \begin{array}{cccc}
0 & 0 & 1 & 0 \\
0 & 0 & 0 & -1 \\
-1 & 0 & 0 & 0 \\
0 & 1 & 0 & 0
\end{array} \right).$$

The matrix $\gamma^0$ is Hermitian while $\gamma^k$ is antihermitian. They satisfy the anticommutation relation,

$$\gamma^{\mu} \gamma^{\nu} + \gamma^{\nu} \gamma^{\mu} = 2 \eta^{\mu \nu}I$$

where $\eta^{\mu \nu}$ is the Minkowski metric with signature $(+---)$ and $I$ is the unit matrix.

$a_1$ and $c_1$ are designated as the fermion annihilation operators for $\nu_1$ and $\overline \nu_1$ respectively, while $a_2$ and $c_2$ are designated as the annihilation operators for $\nu_2$ and $\overline \nu_2$. $\nu_1$ is a right-handed neutrino and $\nu_2$ is a left-handed neutrino. Since only $\nu_2$ and $\overline{\nu}_2$ have been observed, the neutrino field is given by,

The neutrino field is given by,

$\Psi(x) = {1 \over \sqrt{V}} \sum_\mathbf{k} \left\{ \left[ a_2(\mathbf{k}) u^{+1}_{-1}(\mathbf{k}) \right] e^{i k x} \right.$$\left. + \left[ c_2^\dagger(\mathbf{k}) u^{-1}_{+1}(\mathbf{-k}) \right]e^{-i k x} \right\},$

where $k x$ stands for $\mathbf{k} \cdot \mathbf{x} - k_0t$. The $u$'s are spinors with the superscripts and subscripts referring to the energy and helicity states respectively.

Spinor solutions for the Dirac equation are,

$$u^{+1}_{+1}(\mathbf{p}) = \sqrt{ {E + p_3} \over 2 E}
\left( \begin{array}{c}
1 \\
{{p_1 + i p_2} \over {E + p_3}} \\
0 \\
0
\end{array} \right),$$
$$u^{-1}_{-1}(\mathbf{p}) = \sqrt{ {E + p_3} \over 2 E}
\left( \begin{array}{c}
{{-p_1 + i p_2} \over {E + p_3}} \\
1 \\
0 \\
0
\end{array} \right),$$
$$u^{-1}_{+1}(\mathbf{p}) = \sqrt{ {E + p_3} \over 2 E}
\left( \begin{array}{c}
0 \\
0 \\
1 \\
{{p_1 + i p_2} \over {E + p_3}}
\end{array} \right),$$
$$u^{+1}_{-1}(\mathbf{p}) = \sqrt{ {E + p_3} \over 2 E}
\left( \begin{array}{c}
0 \\
0 \\
{{-p_1 + i p_2} \over {E + p_3}} \\
1
\end{array} \right).$$

The neutrino spinors for negative momenta are related to those of positive momenta by,

$$u^{+1}_{+1}(\mathbf{-p}) = u^{-1}_{-1}(\mathbf{p}),$$
$$u^{-1}_{-1}(\mathbf{-p}) = u^{+1}_{+1}(\mathbf{p}),$$
$$u^{+1}_{-1}(\mathbf{-p}) = u^{-1}_{+1}(\mathbf{p}),$$
$$u^{-1}_{+1}(\mathbf{-p}) = u^{+1}_{-1}(\mathbf{p}).$$

=== The composite photon field ===
De Broglie and Kronig suggested the use of a local interaction to bind the neutrino–antineutrino pair. (Rosen and Singer have used a delta potential interaction in forming a composite photon.) Fermi and Yang used a local interaction to bind a fermion–antifermion pair in attempting to form a pion. A four-vector field can be created from a fermion–antifermion pair,

$$\Psi^\dagger \gamma_0 \gamma_{\mu} \Psi.$$

Forming the photon field can be done simply by,

$$A_\mu(x) =  \sum_\mathbf{p} {-1 \over 2 \sqrt{V p_0}}\left\{
\left[Q_R(\mathbf{p}) u^{+1}_{-1}(\mathbf{p})^\dagger \gamma_0 \gamma_{\mu} u^{-1}_{+1}(\mathbf{p})
+ Q_L(\mathbf{p}) u^{-1}_{+1}(\mathbf{p})^\dagger \gamma_0 \gamma_{\mu}
u^{+1}_{-1}(\mathbf{p})  \right]e^{i p x}
\right.$$
$$\left. + \left[Q_R^\dagger(\mathbf{p}) u^{-1}_{+1}(\mathbf{p})^\dagger \gamma_0 \gamma_{\mu} u^{+1}_{-1}(\mathbf{p})
+ Q_L^\dagger(\mathbf{p}) u^{+1}_{-1}(\mathbf{p})^\dagger \gamma_0 \gamma_{\mu} u^{-1}_{+1}(\mathbf{p})
\right]e^{-i p x}  \right\}, \quad\quad (1)$$

where $p x = \mathbf{p} \cdot \mathbf{x} - p_0t = \mathbf{p} \cdot \mathbf{x} - Et$.

The annihilation operators for right-handed and left-handed photons formed of fermion–antifermion pairs are defined as,

$$Q_R(\mathbf{p}) = \sum_\mathbf{k} F^\dagger(\mathbf{k})
\left [ c_2(\mathbf{p}/2+\mathbf{k})a_2(\mathbf{p}/2-\mathbf{k}) \right ]$$
$$Q_L(\mathbf{p}) = \sum_\mathbf{k} F^\dagger(\mathbf{k})
\left [ c_2(\mathbf{p}/2-\mathbf{k})a_2(\mathbf{p}/2+\mathbf{k}) \right ].$$

$F(\mathbf{k})$ is a spectral function, normalized by $\sum_\mathbf{k} \left| F(\mathbf{k}) \right|^2 = 1.$

== Photon polarization vectors ==
The polarization vectors corresponding to the combinations used in Eq. (1) are,

$$\epsilon_\mu^1( p ) = {-1 \over \sqrt{2}} [u^{+1}_{-1}(\mathbf{p})]^\dagger
\gamma_0 \gamma_{\mu} u^{-1}_{+1}(\mathbf{p}),$$
$$\epsilon_\mu^2( p ) = {-1 \over \sqrt{2}} [u^{-1}_{+1}(\mathbf{p})]^\dagger
\gamma_0 \gamma_{\mu} u^{+1}_{-1}(\mathbf{p}).$$

Carrying out the matrix multiplications results in,

$$\epsilon_\mu^1(p) \!= \!{1 \over \sqrt{2}} \left(
{{-i p_1 p_2 \!+\!E^2 \!+\!p_3 E \!-\!p_1^2} \over {E(E + p_3)}},
{{- p_1 p_2 \! + \!iE^2 \! +\!ip_3 E \! - \!ip_2^2 }
\over {E(E + p_3)}},
{{\!-p_1 \!- \!i p_2} \over E}, 0 \right),$$
$$\epsilon_\mu^2(p) \!= \!{1 \over \sqrt{2}} \left(
{{i p_1 p_2 \!+\!E^2 \!+\!p_3 E \!-\!p_1^2} \over {E(E + p_3)}},
{{-p_1 p_2 \! - \!iE^2 \! -\!ip_3 E \! + \!ip_2^2 }
\over {E(E + p_3)}},
{{\!-p_1 \!+ \!i p_2} \over E}, 0 \right), \quad (2)$$

where $\epsilon_0^1(p)$ and $\epsilon_0^2(p)$ have been placed on the right.

For massless fermions the polarization vectors depend only upon the direction of $\mathbf{p}$. Let $\mathbf{n} = \mathbf{p}/ |\mathbf{p}|$.

$$\epsilon_\mu^1(n) \!= \!{1 \over \sqrt{2}} \left(
{{-i n_1 n_2 \!+\!1 \!+\!n_3 \!-\!n_1^2} \over {1 + n_3}},
{{- n_1 n_2 \!+ \!in_1^2 \!+ \!in_3^2 \!+ \!in_3}
\over {1 + n_3}},
\!-n_1 \!- \!i n_2, 0 \right),$$
$$\epsilon_\mu^2(n) \!= \!{1 \over \sqrt{2}} \left(
{{i n_1 n_2 \!+\!1 \!+\!n_3 \!-\!n_1^2} \over {1 + n_3}},
{{- n_1 n_2 \!- \!in_1^2 \!- \!in_3^2 \!- \!in_3}
\over {1 + n_3}},
\!-n_1 \!+ \!i n_2, 0 \right).$$

These polarization vectors satisfy the normalization relation,

$$\epsilon_\mu^j(p) \cdot \epsilon_\mu^{j*}(p) = 1,$$
$$\epsilon_\mu^j(p) \cdot \epsilon_\mu^{k*}(p) = 0 \;\; \text{for} \;\; k \ne j.$$

The Lorentz-invariant dot products of the internal four-momentum $p_\mu$ with the polarization vectors are,

$$p_\mu \epsilon_\mu^1(p) = 0,$$
$$p_\mu \epsilon_\mu^2(p) = 0. \quad\quad\quad\quad (3)$$

In three dimensions,

$$\mathbf{p} \cdot  \mathbf{\epsilon^1}(\mathbf{p}) =
\mathbf{p} \cdot  \mathbf{\epsilon^2}(\mathbf{p}) = 0,$$
$$\mathbf{\epsilon^1}(\mathbf{p}) \times
\mathbf{\epsilon^2}(\mathbf{p})= -i\mathbf{p} / p_0,$$
$$\mathbf{p} \times \mathbf{\epsilon^1}(\mathbf{p})=-i p_0
\mathbf{\epsilon^1}(\mathbf{p}),$$
$$\mathbf{p} \times \mathbf{\epsilon^2}(\mathbf{p})= i p_0
\mathbf{\epsilon^2}(\mathbf{p}). \quad\quad\quad\quad (4)$$

== Composite photon satisfies Maxwell’s equations ==
In terms of the polarization vectors, $A_\mu(x)$ becomes,

$$A_\mu(x) =  \sum_\mathbf{p} {1 \over \sqrt{2 V p_0}}\left\{
\left[Q_R(\mathbf{p}) \epsilon_\mu^1(\mathbf{p}) + Q_L(\mathbf{p})
\epsilon_\mu^2(\mathbf{p})
\right]e^{i p x} \right.$$
$$\left. + \left[Q_R^\dagger(\mathbf{p}) \epsilon_\mu^{1*}(\mathbf{p})
+ Q_L^\dagger(\mathbf{p}) \epsilon_\mu^{2*}(\mathbf{p})
\right]e^{-i p x}  \right\}.  \quad\quad\quad (5)$$

The electric field $\mathbf{E}~$and magnetic field $\mathbf{H}~$are given by,

$$\mathbf{E}(x) = - { \partial \mathbf{A}(x) \over \partial t },$$
$$\mathbf{H}(x) = \nabla \times \mathbf{A}(x).  \quad\quad\quad\quad (6)$$

Applying Eq. (6) to Eq. (5), results in,

$$E_\mu(x) =  i \sum_\mathbf{p} {\sqrt{p_0} \over \sqrt{2 V }}\left\{
\left[Q_R(\mathbf{p}) \epsilon_\mu^1(\mathbf{p})
+ Q_L(\mathbf{p}) \epsilon_\mu^2(\mathbf{p})  \right]e^{i p x}
\right.$$
$$\left. - \left[Q_R^\dagger(\mathbf{p}) \epsilon_\mu^{1*}(\mathbf{p})
+ Q_L^\dagger(\mathbf{p}) \epsilon_\mu^{2*}(\mathbf{p}),
\right]e^{-i p x}  \right\}.$$
$$H_\mu(x) =  \sum_\mathbf{p} {\sqrt{p_0} \over \sqrt{2 V }}\left\{
\left[Q_R(\mathbf{p}) \epsilon_\mu^1(\mathbf{p})
- Q_L(\mathbf{p}) \epsilon_\mu^2(\mathbf{p})  \right]e^{i p x}
\right.$$
$$\left. + \left[Q_R^\dagger(\mathbf{p}) \epsilon_\mu^{1*}(\mathbf{p})
- Q_L^\dagger(\mathbf{p}) \epsilon_\mu^{2*}(\mathbf{p}),
\right]e^{-i p x}  \right\}.$$

Maxwell's equations for free space are obtained as follows:

$$\partial E_1(x) / \partial x_1 =
i \sum_\mathbf{p} {\sqrt{p_0} \over \sqrt{2 V }}\left\{
\left[Q_R(\mathbf{p}) p_1 \epsilon_1^1(\mathbf{p})
+ Q_L(\mathbf{p}) p_1 \epsilon_1^2(\mathbf{p})  \right]e^{i p x}
\right.$$
$$\left. + \left[Q_R^\dagger(\mathbf{p}) p_1 \epsilon_1^{1*}(\mathbf{p})
+ Q_L^\dagger(\mathbf{p}) p_1 \epsilon_1^{2*}(\mathbf{p})
\right]e^{-i p x}  \right\}.$$

Thus, $\partial E_1(x) / \partial x_1 + \partial E_2(x) / \partial x_2 + \partial E_3(x) / \partial x_3$ contains terms of the form $p_1 \epsilon_1^1(\mathbf{p}) + p_2 \epsilon_2^1(\mathbf{p}) + p_3 \epsilon_3^1(\mathbf{p})$ which equate to zero by the first of Eq. (4). This gives,

$$\nabla \cdot \mathbf{E}(x) = 0,$$
$$\nabla \cdot \mathbf{H}(x) = 0.$$

as $\mathbf{H}$ contains similar terms.

The expression $\nabla \times \mathbf{E}(x)$ contains terms of the form $\mathbf{p} \times \mathbf{\epsilon^1}(\mathbf{p})$ while $\partial \mathbf{H}(x) / \partial t$ contains terms of form $i p_0 \mathbf{\epsilon^1}(\mathbf{p})$. Thus, the last two equations of (4) can be used to show that,

$$\nabla \times \mathbf{E}(x) = - \partial \mathbf{H}(x) / \partial t,$$
$$\nabla \times \mathbf{H}(x) = \partial \mathbf{E}(x) / \partial t.$$

Although the neutrino field violates parity and charge conjugation, $\mathbf{E}$ and $\mathbf{H}$ transform in the usual way,

$$P \mathbf{E}(\mathbf{x},t) P^-1 = -\mathbf{E}(\mathbf{-x},t),$$
$$P \mathbf{H}(\mathbf{x},t) P^-1 = \mathbf{H}(\mathbf{-x},t),$$
$$C \mathbf{E}(\mathbf{x},t) C^-1 = -\mathbf{E}(\mathbf{x},t),$$
$$C \mathbf{H}(\mathbf{x},t) C^-1 = -\mathbf{H}(\mathbf{x},t).$$

$A_\mu$ satisfies the Lorenz condition,

$$\partial A_\mu / \partial x_\mu = 0$$

which follows from Eq. (3).

Although many choices for gamma matrices can satisfy the Dirac equation, it is essential that one use the Weyl representation in order to get the correct photon polarization vectors and $\mathbf{E}$ and $\mathbf{H}$ that satisfy Maxwell's equations. Kronig first realized this. In the Weyl representation, the four-component spinors are describing two sets of two-component neutrinos. The connection between the photon antisymmetric tensor and the two-component Weyl equation was also noted by Sen. One can also produce the above results using a two-component neutrino theory.

To compute the commutation relations for the photon field, one needs the equation,

$$\sum_{j=1}^2 \epsilon_{\mu}^j(\mathbf{p}) \epsilon_{\nu}^{j*}(\mathbf{p})
== \sum_{j==1}^2 \epsilon_{\mu}^{j*}(\mathbf{p}) \epsilon_{\nu}^j(\mathbf{p})
= \delta_{\mu \nu} - {p_{\mu} p_{\nu} \over E^2}.$$

To obtain this equation, Kronig wrote a relation between the neutrino spinors that was not rotationally invariant as pointed out by Pryce. However, as Perkins showed, this equation follows directly from summing over the polarization vectors, Eq. (2), that were obtained by explicitly solving for the neutrino spinors.

If the momentum is along the third axis, $\epsilon_\mu^1(n)$ and $\epsilon_\mu^2(n)$ reduce to the usual polarization vectors for right and left circularly polarized photons respectively.

$$\epsilon_\mu^1(n) = {1 \over \sqrt{2}}(1,i,0,0),$$
$$\epsilon_\mu^2(n) = {1 \over \sqrt{2}}(1,-i,0,0).$$

== How the composite photon theory differs from the Standard Model elementary photon theory ==
Although composite photons satisfy many properties of real photons, there are major differences between composite photons and elementary photons

=== Bose–Einstein commutation relations ===
It is known that a photon is a boson. Does the composite photon satisfy Bose–Einstein commutation relations? Fermions are defined as the particles whose creation and annihilation operators adhere to the anticommutation relations

$$\{a(\mathbf{k}),a(\mathbf{l})\} = 0,$$
$$\{a^\dagger(\mathbf{k}),a^\dagger(\mathbf{l})\} = 0,$$
$$\{a(\mathbf{k}),a^\dagger(\mathbf{l})\}
= \delta(\mathbf{k}-\mathbf{l}),$$

while bosons are defined as the particles that adhere to the commutation relations

$$\left[b(\mathbf{k}),b(\mathbf{l})\right] = 0,$$
$$\left[b^\dagger(\mathbf{k}),b^\dagger(\mathbf{l})\right] = 0,$$
$$\left[b(\mathbf{k}),b^\dagger(\mathbf{l})\right]
= \delta(\mathbf{k}-\mathbf{l}). \quad\quad (7)$$

The creation and annihilation operators of composite particles formed of fermion pairs adhere to the commutation relations of the form

$$\left[Q(\mathbf{k}),Q(\mathbf{l})\right] = 0,$$
$$\left[Q^\dagger(\mathbf{k}),Q^\dagger(\mathbf{l})\right] = 0,$$
$$\left[Q(\mathbf{k}),Q^\dagger(\mathbf{l})\right]
= \delta(\mathbf{k}-\mathbf{l})- \Delta(\mathbf{k},\mathbf{l}). \quad\quad (8)$$

with

$$\Delta(\mathbf{p}^{\prime},\mathbf{p}) =
\sum_\mathbf{k} F^\dagger(\mathbf{k}) \left[
F(\mathbf{p}^{\prime}/2-\mathbf{p}/2+\mathbf{k})
a^\dagger(\mathbf{p}-\mathbf{p}^{\prime}/2-\mathbf{k})
a(\mathbf{p}^{\prime}/2-\mathbf{k}) \right.$$
$$\left.
+ F(\mathbf{p}/2-\mathbf{p}^{\prime}/2+\mathbf{k})
c^\dagger(\mathbf{p}-\mathbf{p}^{\prime}/2+\mathbf{k})
c(\mathbf{p}^{\prime}/2+\mathbf{k}) \right].  \quad\quad (9)$$

For Cooper electron pairs, "a" and "c" represent different spin directions. For nucleon pairs (the deuteron), "a" and "c" represent proton and neutron. For neutrino–antineutrino pairs, "a" and "c" represent neutrino and antineutrino. The size of the deviations from pure Bose behavior,

$$\Delta(\mathbf{p}^{\prime},\mathbf{p}),$$

depends on the degree of overlap of the fermion wave functions and the constraints of the Pauli exclusion principle.

If the state has the form

$$|\Phi \rangle = a^\dagger(\mathbf{k_1})
a^\dagger(\mathbf{k_2})...a^\dagger(\mathbf{k_n})
c^\dagger(\mathbf{q_1})c^\dagger(\mathbf{q_2})...c^\dagger(\mathbf{q_m})|0 \rangle$$

then the expectation value of Eq. (9) vanishes for $\mathbf{p}^{\prime} \ne \mathbf{p}$, and the expression for $\Delta(\mathbf{p}^{\prime},\mathbf{p})$ can be approximated by

$$\Delta(\mathbf{p}^{\prime},\mathbf{p}) =
\delta(\mathbf{p}^{\prime}-\mathbf{p})
\sum_\mathbf{k} \left| F(\mathbf{k}) \right|^2
\left[ a^\dagger(\mathbf{p}/2-\mathbf{k})
a(\mathbf{p}/2-\mathbf{k}) \right.$$
$$\left.
+ c^\dagger(\mathbf{p}/2+\mathbf{k})
c(\mathbf{p}/2+\mathbf{k}) \right].$$

Using the fermion number operators $n_a(\mathbf{k})$ and $n_c(\mathbf{k})$, this can be written,

$$\Delta(\mathbf{p}^{\prime},\mathbf{p}) =
\delta(\mathbf{p}^{\prime}-\mathbf{p})
\sum_\mathbf{k} \left| F(\mathbf{k}) \right|^2
\left[ n_a( \mathbf{p}/2-\mathbf{k})
+ n_c(\mathbf{p}/2+\mathbf{k})
\right]$$
$$= \delta(\mathbf{p}^{\prime}-\mathbf{p})
\sum_\mathbf{k} \left[ \left| F(\mathbf{p}/2-\mathbf{k}) \right|^2
n_a(\mathbf{k}) + \left| F(\mathbf{k}- \mathbf{p}/2) \right|^2
n_c(\mathbf{k}) \right]$$
$$= \delta(\mathbf{p}^{\prime}-\mathbf{p})
\overline {\Delta} (\mathbf{p},\mathbf{p})$$

showing that it is the average number of fermions in a particular state $\mathbf{k}$ averaged over all states with weighting factors $F( \mathbf{p}/2-\mathbf{k})$ and $F(\mathbf{k}-\mathbf{p}/2)$.

==== Jordan’s attempt to solve problem ====
De Broglie did not address the problem of statistics for the composite photon. However, "Jordan considered the essential part of the problem was to construct Bose–Einstein amplitudes from Fermi–Dirac amplitudes", as Pryce noted. Jordan "suggested that it is not the interaction between neutrinos and antineutrinos that binds them together into photons, but rather the manner in which they interact with charged particles that leads to the simplified description of light in terms of photons."

Jordan's hypothesis eliminated the need for theorizing an unknown interaction, but his hypothesis that the neutrino and antineutrino are emitted in exactly the same direction seems rather artificial as noted by Fock. His strong desire to obtain exact Bose–Einstein commutation relations for the composite photon led him to work with a scalar or longitudinally polarized photon. Greenberg and Wightman have pointed out why the one-dimensional case works, but the three-dimensional case does not.

In 1928, Jordan noticed that commutation relations for pairs of fermions were similar to those for bosons. Compare Eq. (7) with Eq. (8). From 1935 until 1937, Jordan, Kronig, and others tried to obtain exact Bose–Einstein commutation relations for the composite photon. Terms were added to the commutation relations to cancel out the delta term in Eq. (8). These terms corresponded to "simulated photons". For example, the absorption of a photon of momentum $\mathbf{p}$ could be simulated by a Raman effect in which a neutrino with momentum $\mathbf{p+k}$ is absorbed while another of another with opposite spin and momentum $\mathbf{k}$ is emitted. (It is now known that single neutrinos or antineutrinos interact so weakly that they cannot simulate photons.)

==== Pryce’s theorem ====
In 1938, Pryce showed that one cannot obtain both Bose–Einstein statistics and transversely polarized photons from neutrino–antineutrino pairs. Construction of transversely polarized photons is not the problem. As Berezinskii noted, "The only actual difficulty is that the construction of a transverse four-vector is incompatible with the requirement of statistics." In some ways Berezinski gives a clearer picture of the problem. A simple version of the proof is as follows:

The expectation values of the commutation relations for composite right and left-handed photons are:

$$\left[ Q_R(\mathbf{p}^{\prime}),
Q_R(\mathbf{p}) \right] = 0, \;
\left[ Q_L(\mathbf{p}^{\prime}),
Q_L(\mathbf{p}) \right] = 0,$$
$$\left[ Q_R(\mathbf{p}^{\prime}),
Q_R^\dagger(\mathbf{p}) \right]
= \delta( \mathbf{p}^{\prime} - \mathbf{p})
(1 -{\overline \Delta_{12}}(\mathbf{p},\mathbf{p})),$$
$$\left[ Q_L(\mathbf{p}^{\prime}),
Q_L^\dagger(\mathbf{p}) \right]
= \delta( \mathbf{p}^{\prime} - \mathbf{p})
(1 -{\overline \Delta_{21}}(\mathbf{p},\mathbf{p})),$$
$$\left[ Q_R(\mathbf{p}^{\prime}),
Q_L(\mathbf{p}) \right] = 0, \;
\left[ Q_R(\mathbf{p}^{\prime}),
Q_L^\dagger(\mathbf{p}) \right] = 0, \quad\quad\quad\quad (10)$$

where

$${\overline \Delta_{12}}(\mathbf{p},\mathbf{p}) =
\sum_\mathbf{k} \left[
\left| F(\mathbf{k}-\mathbf{p}/2) \right|^2 (n_{a1}(\mathbf{k}) + n_{c2}(\mathbf{k}) )
\right.$$
$$\left.
+ \left| F(\mathbf{p}/2-\mathbf{k}) \right|^2 ( n_{c1}(\mathbf{k}) + n_{a2}(\mathbf{k}) )
\right].  \quad\quad\quad\quad (11)$$

The deviation from Bose–Einstein statistics is caused by $\overline \Delta_{12}(\mathbf{p},\mathbf{p})$ and $\overline \Delta_{21}(\mathbf{p},\mathbf{p})$, which are functions of the neutrino numbers operators.

Linear polarization photon operators are defined by

$$\xi( \mathbf{p}) = {1 \over \sqrt{2}} \left[ Q_L(\mathbf{p})
+ Q_R(\mathbf{p}) \right],$$
$$\eta( \mathbf{p}) = {i \over \sqrt{2}} \left[ Q_L(\mathbf{p})
- Q_R(\mathbf{p}) \right]. \quad\quad\quad\quad (12)$$

A particularly interesting commutation relation is,

$$[\xi( \mathbf{p}^{\prime}),\eta^\dagger( \mathbf{p})]
= {i \over 2} \delta( \mathbf{p}^{\prime} - \mathbf{p})
[\overline \Delta_{21}(\mathbf{p},\mathbf{p})
-\overline \Delta_{12}(\mathbf{p},\mathbf{p})], \quad\quad (13)$$

which follows from (10) and (12).

For the composite photon to obey Bose–Einstein commutation relations, at the very least,

$$[\xi( \mathbf{p}^{\prime}),\eta^\dagger( \mathbf{p})]
= 0   \quad\quad\quad\quad (14)$$

Pryce noted. From Eq. (11) and Eq. (13) the requirement is that

$$\sum_\mathbf{k} \left[
\left| F(\mathbf{k}-\mathbf{p}/2) \right|^2
(n_{a1}(\mathbf{k}) + n_{c2}(\mathbf{k}) - n_{a2}(\mathbf{k}) - n_{c1}(\mathbf{k}) )
\right.$$
$$\left. + \left| F(\mathbf{p}/2-\mathbf{k}) \right|^2
( n_{c1}(\mathbf{k}) + n_{a2}(\mathbf{k}) - n_{c2}(\mathbf{k}) - n_{a1}(\mathbf{k}) )
\right]$$

gives zero when applied to any state vector. Thus, all the coefficients of $n_{a1}(\mathbf{k})$ and $n_{c1}(\mathbf{k})$, etc. must vanish separately. This means $F(\mathbf{k}) = 0$, and the composite photon does not exist, completing the proof.

==== Perkins’ attempt to solve problem ====
Perkins reasoned that the photon does not have to obey Bose–Einstein commutation relations, because the non-Bose terms are small and they may not cause any detectable effects. Perkins noted, "As presented in many quantum mechanics texts it may appear that Bose statistics follow from basic principles, but it is really from the classical canonical formalism. This is not a reliable procedure as evidenced by the fact that it gives the completely wrong result for spin-1/2 particles." Furthermore, "most integral spin particles (light mesons, strange mesons, etc.) are composite particles formed of quarks. Because of their underlying fermion structure, these integral spin particles are not fundamental bosons, but composite quasibosons. However, in the asymptotic limit, which generally applies, they are essentially bosons. For these particles, Bose commutation relations are just an approximation, albeit a very good one. There are some differences; bringing two of these composite particles close together will force their identical fermions to jump to excited states because of the Pauli exclusion principle."

Berezinskii in reaffirming Pryce's theorem argues that commutation relation (14) is necessary for the photon to be truly neutral. However, Perkins has shown that a neutral photon in the usual sense can be obtained without Bose–Einstein commutation relations.

The number operator for a composite photon is defined as

$$N(\mathbf{p}) = Q^\dagger(\mathbf{p}) Q(\mathbf{p}).$$

Lipkin suggested for a rough estimate to assume that $F(\mathbf{k})= 1 / \Omega$ where $\Omega$ is a constant equal to the number of states used to construct the wave packet.

Perkins showed that the effect of the composite photon's number operator acting on a state of $m$ composite photons is,

$$N(\mathbf{p}) (Q^\dagger(\mathbf{p}))^m|0\rangle \;
= \left( m - {m(m-1) \over \Omega }
\right) (Q^\dagger(\mathbf{p}))^m|0\rangle,$$

using $N(\mathbf{p})|0\rangle = 0$. This result differs from the usual one because of the second term which is small for large $\Omega$. Normalizing in the usual manner,

$$Q^\dagger(\mathbf{p})|n_\mathbf{p} \rangle \;
= \sqrt{ (n_\mathbf{p} +1)
\left( 1- {n_\mathbf{p} \over \Omega} \right) }
|n_\mathbf{p} +1\rangle,$$
$$Q(\mathbf{p})|n_\mathbf{p} \rangle \;
= \sqrt{ n_\mathbf{p}
\left( 1- {(n_\mathbf{p}-1) \over \Omega} \right) }
|n_\mathbf{p} -1\rangle,  \quad\quad\quad\quad (15)$$

where $|n_\mathbf{p}\rangle$ is the state of $n_\mathbf{p}$ composite photons having momentum $\mathbf{p}$ which is created by applying $Q^\dagger(\mathbf{p})$ on the vacuum $n_\mathbf{p}$ times. Note that,

$$Q^\dagger(\mathbf{p})|0 \rangle =  | 1_\mathbf{p}\rangle,$$
$$Q(\mathbf{p})|1_\mathbf{p}\rangle  =  |0\rangle,$$

which is the same result as obtained with boson operators. The formulas in Eq. (15) are similar to the usual ones with correction factors that approach zero for large $\Omega$.

===== Blackbody radiation =====
The main evidence indicating that photons are bosons comes from the Blackbody radiation experiments which are in agreement with Planck's distribution. Perkins calculated the photon distribution for Blackbody radiation using the second quantization method, but with a composite photon.

The atoms in the walls of the cavity are taken to be a two-level system with photons emitted from the upper level β and absorbed at the lower level α. The transition probability for emission of a photon is enhanced when n_{p} photons are present,

$$w_{\alpha \beta}( n_\mathbf{p} + 1 \leftarrow n_\mathbf{p} ) = (n_\mathbf{p} + 1) \left( 1 - {n_\mathbf{p} \over \Omega} \right) w_{\alpha \beta}( 1_\mathbf{p}  \leftarrow 0), \quad  (16)$$

where the first of (15) has been used. The absorption is enhanced less since the second of (15) is used,

$$w_{ \beta \alpha}( n_\mathbf{p} - 1 \leftarrow n_\mathbf{p} ) = n_\mathbf{p} \left( 1 - {n_\mathbf{p}-1 \over \Omega} \right) w_{ \beta \alpha}( 0 \leftarrow  1_\mathbf{p}). \quad (17)$$

Using the equality,

$$w_{ \beta \alpha}( 0 \leftarrow  1_\mathbf{p}) = w_{ \alpha \beta}(  1_\mathbf{p} \leftarrow 0 ),$$

of the transition rates, Eqs. (16) and (17) are combined to give,

$${w_{\alpha \beta}( n_\mathbf{p}+1 \leftarrow n_\mathbf{p}) \over w_{ \beta \alpha}( n_\mathbf{p} - 1 \leftarrow n_\mathbf{p} )} = {(n_\mathbf{p}+1) \left( 1 - {n_\mathbf{p} \over \Omega} \right) \over n_\mathbf{p} \left( 1 - {(n_\mathbf{p}-1) \over \Omega} \right)}.$$

The probability of finding the system with energy E is proportional to e^{−E/kT} according to Boltzmann's distribution law. Thus, the equilibrium between emission and absorption requires that,

$$w_{\alpha \beta}( n_\mathbf{p}+1 \leftarrow n_\mathbf{p} ) e^{-E_{\beta} /kT} = w_{ \beta \alpha}( n_\mathbf{p} - 1 \leftarrow n_\mathbf{p} ) e^{-E_{\alpha} /kT},$$

with the photon energy $\omega_p = E_{\beta} - E_{\alpha}$. Combining the last two equations results in,

$$n_\mathbf{p} = {2 \over u+(u+2)/ \Omega + \sqrt{u^2(1+2/\Omega) + (u+2)^2 /\Omega^2}},$$

with $u = e^{\omega_p/kT} - 1$. For $\Omega(\omega_p /kT) \gg 1$, this reduces to

$$n_\mathbf{p} = {1 \over e^{\omega_p /kT} \left( 1 + {1 \over \Omega} \right) - 1}.$$

This equation differs from Planck's law because of the $1 / \Omega$ term. For the conditions used in the blackbody radiation experiments of W. W. Coblentz, Perkins estimates that 1 / Ω < 10^{−9}, and the maximum deviation from Planck's law is less than one part in 10^{−8}, which is too small to be detected.
