= John George Valatin =

British-Hungarian theoretical physicist (1918–1978)

- Born: Valatin János Györgi; 1918; Budapest, Hungary
- Died: April 19, 1978 (aged 59–60)
- Citizenship: Hungary; United Kingdom
- Education: Technical University of Budapest (PhD); University of Paris (D.Sc.)
- Known for: Bogoliubov–Valatin transformation
- Scientific career
- Fields: Theoretical physics
- Workplaces: University of Birmingham; Queen Mary University of London

John George Valatin (Hungarian: Valatin János Györgi, 1918–April 19, 1978) (Note: In French he published under the name Jean G. Valatin.) was a British–Hungarian theoretical physicist and professor at Queen Mary University of London. He is known for his work in quantum field theory, particle physics and condensed matter physics. He developed the Bogoliubov–Valatin transformation in many-body quantum mechanics.

== Early life and education ==
John George Valatin was born in Budapest, Hungary.

He studied engineering at the Technical University of Budapest. He earned a doctorate for his work in molecular spectra. He later left to work in industry. After World War II, he came back to the university to work as a lecturer. He worked in the Institute of Experimental Physics.

== Career abroad ==
In 1947, he went to work with Louis de Broglie at the Institut Henri Poincaré in France. He was awarded a Doctor of Science diploma by the University of Paris for his dissertation on the theory of the positron. Afterwards, he left to the Niels Bohr Institute in Copenhague, Sweden, in 1950 where he worked on a covariant gauge-independent formulation of quantum electrodynamics.

In 1952 he joined the group of Rudolf Peierls and Paul Taunton Matthews in Birmingham University where he spent 13 years. With Peierls, Valatin learned to write quantum field theory using Feynman diagrams. There he worked on point-splitting regularization for divergences in quantum electrodynamics. During that time he received British citizenship. After John Bardeen, Leon Cooper and John Schrieffer developed the BCS theory of superconductivity, Schrieffer worked with Valatin in Birmingham as a postdoc. Influenced by him, Valatin developed in 1957 the transformations now known as Bogoliubov-Valatin transformations independently published from Nikolay Bogolyubov. Valatin worked on generalizations of the Hartree–Fock method for superconductors. With Ben Roy Mottelson and David Thouless, he generalized the Hartree–Fock method for pairing forces in nuclear physics. Together they developed the Thouless–Valatin formula, also known as the self-consistent cranking model. With Carlo Di Castro, a PhD student at the time, Valatin worked on phase transitions in superconducting thin films.

In 1965, he was offered a chair at Queen Mary College, London, where he established a theoretical physics group to work both in particle and condensed matter physics.

== Personal life ==
Valatin had two sons with his wife. He was also a devoted Christian.

== Books ==
- Valatin, J. G. (1951). On Quantum Electrodynamics. Ejnar Munksgaard.
