= Bogoliubov transformation =

Mathematical operation in quantum optics, general relativity and other areas of physics

In theoretical physics, the Bogoliubov transformation, also known as the Bogoliubov–Valatin transformation, was independently developed in 1958 by Nikolay Bogolyubov and John George Valatin for finding solutions of BCS theory in a homogeneous system. The Bogoliubov transformation is an isomorphism of either the canonical commutation relation algebra or canonical anticommutation relation algebra. This induces an autoequivalence on the respective representations. The Bogoliubov transformation is often used to diagonalize Hamiltonians, which yields the stationary solutions of the corresponding Schrödinger equation. The Bogoliubov transformation is also important for understanding the Unruh effect, Hawking radiation, Davies–Fulling radiation (moving mirror model), pairing effects in nuclear physics, and many other topics.

The Bogoliubov transformation is often used to diagonalize Hamiltonians, with a corresponding transformation of the state function. Operator eigenvalues calculated with the diagonalized Hamiltonian on the transformed state function thus are the same as before.

== Single bosonic mode example ==
Consider the canonical commutation relation for bosonic creation and annihilation operators in the harmonic oscillator basis

$$\left [ \hat{a}, \hat{a}^\dagger \right ] = 1.$$

Define a new pair of operators

$$\hat{b} = u \hat{a} + v \hat{a}^\dagger,$$
$$\hat{b}^\dagger = u^* \hat{a}^\dagger + v^* \hat{a},$$

for complex numbers u and v, where the latter is the Hermitian conjugate of the first.

The Bogoliubov transformation is the canonical transformation mapping the operators $\hat{a}$ and $\hat{a}^\dagger$ to $\hat{b}$ and $\hat{b}^\dagger$. To find the conditions on the constants u and v such that the transformation is canonical, the commutator is evaluated, namely,

$$\left [ \hat{b}, \hat{b}^\dagger \right ]
= \left [ u \hat{a} + v \hat{a}^\dagger , u^* \hat{a}^\dagger + v^* \hat{a} \right ]
= \cdots = \left ( |u|^2 - |v|^2 \right ) \left [ \hat{a}, \hat{a}^\dagger \right ].$$

It is then evident that $|u|^2 - |v|^2 = 1$ is the condition for which the transformation is canonical.

Since the form of this condition is suggestive of the hyperbolic identity

$$\cosh^2 x - \sinh^2 x = 1,$$

the constants u and v can be readily parametrized as

$$u = e^{i \theta_1} \cosh r,$$
$$v = e^{i \theta_2} \sinh r.$$

This is interpreted as a linear symplectic transformation of the phase space. By comparing to the Bloch–Messiah decomposition, the two angles $\theta_1$ and $\theta_2$ correspond to the orthogonal symplectic transformations (i.e., rotations) and the squeezing factor $r$ corresponds to the diagonal transformation.

=== Applications ===
The most prominent application is by Nikolai Bogoliubov himself in his theory of a weakly interacting Bose gas. Other applications comprise Hamiltonians and excitations in the theory of antiferromagnetism. When calculating quantum field theory in curved spacetimes the definition of the vacuum changes, and a Bogoliubov transformation between these different vacua is possible. This is used in the derivation of Hawking radiation. Bogoliubov transforms are also used extensively in quantum optics, particularly when working with gaussian unitaries (such as beamsplitters, phase shifters, and squeezing operations).

== Fermionic mode ==
For the anticommutation relations

$$\left\{ \hat{a}, \hat{a}\right\} = 0, \left\{ \hat{a}, \hat{a}^\dagger \right\} = 1,$$

the Bogoliubov transformation is constrained by $uv=0, |u|^2+|v|^2=1$. Therefore, the only non-trivial possibility is $u=0, |v|=1,$ corresponding to particle–antiparticle interchange (or particle–hole interchange in many-body systems) with the possible inclusion of a phase shift. Thus, for a single particle, the transformation can only be implemented (1) for a Dirac fermion, where particle and antiparticle are distinct (as opposed to a Majorana fermion or chiral fermion), or (2) for multi-fermionic systems, in which there is more than one type of fermion.

=== Applications ===
The most prominent application is again by Nikolai Bogoliubov himself, this time for the BCS theory of superconductivity. The point where the necessity to perform a Bogoliubov transform becomes obvious is that in mean-field approximation the Hamiltonian of the system can be written in both cases as a sum of bilinear terms in the original creation and destruction operators, involving finite $\langle a_i^+a_j^+\rangle$ terms, i.e. one must go beyond the usual Hartree–Fock method. In particular, in the mean-field Bogoliubov–de Gennes Hamiltonian formalism with a superconducting pairing term such as $\Delta a_i^+a_j^+ + \text{h.c.}$, the Bogoliubov transformed operators $b, b^\dagger$ annihilate and create quasiparticles (each with well-defined energy, momentum and spin but in a quantum superposition of electron and hole state), and have coefficients $u$ and $v$ given by eigenvectors of the Bogoliubov–de Gennes matrix. Also in nuclear physics, this method is applicable, since it may describe the "pairing energy" of nucleons in a heavy element.

== Multimode example ==
The Hilbert space under consideration is equipped with these operators, and henceforth describes a higher-dimensional quantum harmonic oscillator (usually an infinite-dimensional one).

The ground state of the corresponding Hamiltonian is annihilated by all the annihilation operators:

$$\forall i \qquad a_i |0\rangle = 0.$$

All excited states are obtained as linear combinations of the ground state excited by some creation operators:

$$\prod_{k=1}^n a_{i_k}^\dagger |0\rangle.$$

One may redefine the creation and the annihilation operators by a linear redefinition:

$$a'_i = \sum_j (u_{ij} a_j + v_{ij} a^\dagger_j),$$

where the coefficients $u_{ij},v_{ij}$ must satisfy certain rules to guarantee that the annihilation operators and the creation operators $a^{\prime\dagger}_i$, defined by the Hermitian conjugate equation, have the same commutators for bosons and anticommutators for fermions.

The equation above defines the Bogoliubov transformation of the operators.

The ground state annihilated by all $a'_i$ is different from the original ground state $|0\rangle$, and they can be viewed as the Bogoliubov transformations of one another using the operator–state correspondence. They can also be defined as squeezed coherent states. BCS wave function is an example of squeezed coherent state of fermions.

== Unified matrix description ==
Because Bogoliubov transformations are linear recombination of operators, it is more convenient and insightful to write them in terms of matrix transformations. If a pair of annihilators $(a , b)$ transform as

$$\begin{pmatrix}
\alpha\\
\beta
\end{pmatrix}
=
U
\begin{pmatrix}
a\\
b
\end{pmatrix}$$

where $U$ is a $2\times2$ matrix. Then naturally

$$\begin{pmatrix}
\alpha^\dagger\\
\beta^\dagger
\end{pmatrix}
=
U^*
\begin{pmatrix}
a^\dagger\\
b^\dagger
\end{pmatrix}$$

For fermion operators, the requirement of commutation relations reflects in two requirements for the form of matrix $U$

$$U=
\begin{pmatrix}
u & v\\
-v^* & u^*
\end{pmatrix}$$

and

$$|u|^2 + |v|^2 = 1$$

For boson operators, the commutation relations require

$$U=
\begin{pmatrix}
u & v\\
v^* & u^*
\end{pmatrix}$$

and

$$|u|^2 - |v|^2 = 1$$

These conditions can be written uniformly as

$$U \Gamma_\pm U^\dagger = \Gamma_\pm$$

where

$$\Gamma_\pm =
\begin{pmatrix}
1 & 0\\
0 & \pm1
\end{pmatrix}$$

where $\Gamma_\pm$ applies to fermions and bosons, respectively.

=== Diagonalizing a quadratic Hamiltonian using matrix description ===
Bogoliubov transformation lets us diagonalize a quadratic Hamiltonian

$$\hat{H} =
\begin{pmatrix}
a^\dagger & b^\dagger
\end{pmatrix}
H
\begin{pmatrix}
a \\ b
\end{pmatrix}$$

by just diagonalizing the matrix $\Gamma_\pm H$. In the notations above, it is important to distinguish the operator $\hat{H}$ and the numeric matrix $H$. This fact can be seen by rewriting $\hat{H}$ as

$$\hat{H} =
\begin{pmatrix}
\alpha^\dagger & \beta^\dagger
\end{pmatrix}
\Gamma_\pm U (\Gamma_\pm H) U^{-1}
\begin{pmatrix}
\alpha \\ \beta
\end{pmatrix}$$

and $\Gamma_\pm U (\Gamma_\pm H) U^{-1}=D$ if and only if $U$ diagonalizes $\Gamma_\pm H$, i.e. $U (\Gamma_\pm H) U^{-1} = \Gamma_\pm D$.

Useful properties of Bogoliubov transformations are listed below.

	Boson	Fermion
Transformation matrix	$$U=\begin{pmatrix}u & v\\v^* & u^*\end{pmatrix}$$	$$U=\begin{pmatrix}u & v\\-v^* & u^*\end{pmatrix}$$
Inverse transformation matrix	$$U^{-1} = \begin{pmatrix}u^* & -v\\-v^* & u\end{pmatrix}$$	$$U^{-1}=\begin{pmatrix}u^* & -v\\v^* & u\end{pmatrix}$$
Gamma	$$\Gamma = \begin{pmatrix}1 & 0\\0 & -1\end{pmatrix}$$	$$\Gamma = \begin{pmatrix}1 & 0\\0 & 1\end{pmatrix}$$
Diagonalization	$U(\Gamma H) U^{-1} = \Gamma D$	$U H U^{-1} = D$

== Other applications ==
=== Fermionic condensates ===
Bogoliubov transformations are a crucial mathematical tool for understanding and describing fermionic condensates. They provide a way to diagonalize the Hamiltonian of an interacting fermion system in the presence of a condensate, allowing us to identify the elementary excitations, or quasiparticles, of the system.

In a system where fermions can form pairs, the standard approach of filling single-particle energy levels (the Fermi sea) is insufficient. The presence of a condensate implies a coherent superposition of states with different particle numbers, making the usual creation and annihilation operators inadequate. The Hamiltonian of such a system typically contains terms that create or annihilate pairs of fermions, such as:

$H \sim \sum_k \epsilon_k c_k^\dagger c_k + \sum_k (\Delta_k c_k^\dagger c_{-k}^\dagger + \Delta_k^* c_{-k} c_k)$

where $c_k^\dagger$ and $c_k$ are the creation and annihilation operators for a fermion with momentum $k$, $\epsilon_k$ is the single-particle energy, and $\Delta_k$ is the pairing amplitude, which characterizes the strength of the condensate. This Hamiltonian is not diagonal in terms of the original fermion operators, making it difficult to directly interpret the physical properties of the system. Bogoliubov transformations provide a solution by introducing a new set of quasiparticle operators, $\gamma_k^\dagger$ and $\gamma_k$, which are linear combinations of the original fermion operators:

$$\begin{aligned}
\gamma_k &= u_k c_k - v_k c_{-k}^\dagger \\
\gamma_k^\dagger &= u_k^* c_k^\dagger - v_k^* c_{-k}
\end{aligned}$$

where $u_k$ and $v_k$ are complex coefficients that satisfy the normalization condition $|u_k|^2 + |v_k|^2 = 1$. This transformation mixes particle and hole creation operators, reflecting the fact that the quasiparticles are a superposition of particles and holes due to the pairing interaction. This transformation was first introduced by N. N. Bogoliubov in his seminal work on superfluidity. The coefficients $u_k$ and $v_k$ are chosen such that the Hamiltonian, when expressed in terms of the quasiparticle operators, becomes diagonal:

$H = E_0 + \sum_k E_k \gamma_k^\dagger \gamma_k$

where $E_0$ is the ground state energy and $E_k$ is the energy of the quasiparticle with momentum $k$. The diagonalization process involves solving the Bogoliubov-de Gennes equations, which are a set of self-consistent equations for the coefficients $u_k$, $v_k$, and the pairing amplitude $\Delta_k$. A detailed discussion of the Bogoliubov-de Gennes equations can be found in de Gennes' book on superconductivity.

==== Physical interpretation ====
The Bogoliubov transformation reveals several key features of fermion condensates:

- Bogoliubov quasiparticles: The elementary excitations of the system are not individual fermions but quasiparticles, which are coherent superpositions of particles and holes. These quasiparticles have a modified energy spectrum $E_k = \sqrt{\epsilon_k^2 + |\Delta_k|^2}$, which includes a gap of size $|\Delta_k|$ at zero momentum. This gap represents the energy required to break a Cooper pair and is a hallmark of superconductivity and other fermionic condensate phenomena.
- Ground state: The ground state of the system is not simply an empty Fermi sea but a state where all quasiparticle levels are unoccupied, i.e., $\gamma_k |\mathrm{BCS}\rangle = 0$ for all $k$. This state, often called the BCS state in the context of superconductivity, is a coherent superposition of states with different particle numbers and represents the macroscopic condensate.
- Broken symmetry: The formation of a fermion condensate is often associated with the spontaneous breaking of a symmetry, such as the U(1) gauge symmetry in superconductors. The Bogoliubov transformation provides a way to describe the system in the broken symmetry phase. The connection between broken symmetry and Bogoliubov transformations is explored in Anderson's work on pseudo-spin and gauge invariance.

== See also ==
- Holstein–Primakoff transformation
- Jordan–Wigner transformation
- Jordan–Schwinger transformation
- Klein transformation
- Siegel upper half-space
