= Ernst Jordan (painter) =

German painter (1858–1924)

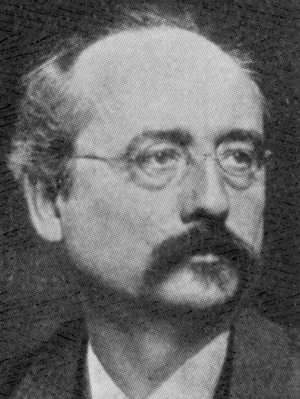
Ernst Jordan

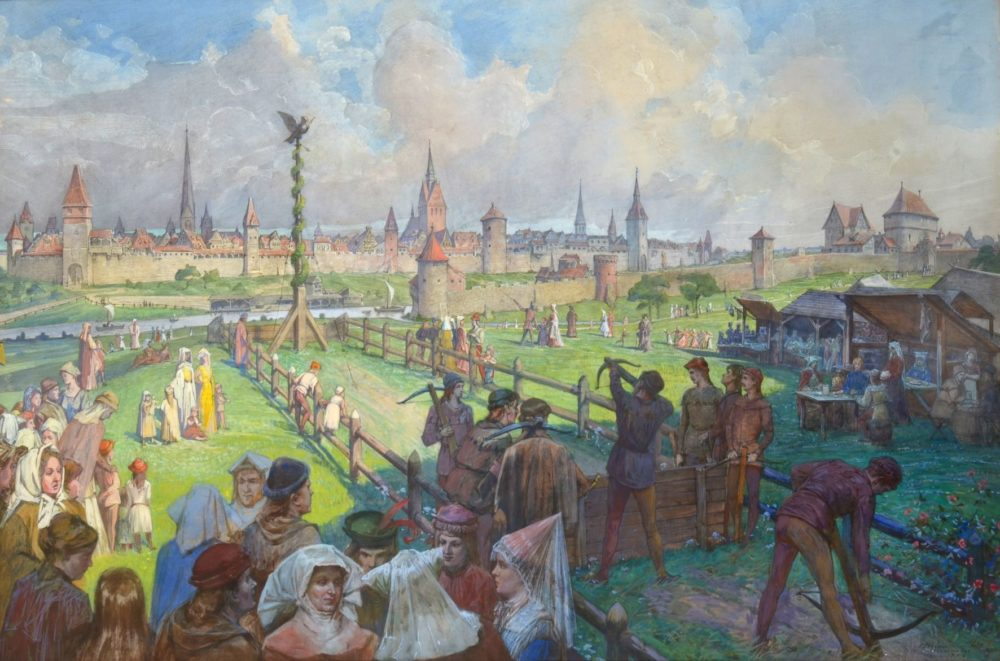
Pentecost Archery Festival in Lauenrode

Ernst Pasqual Jordan (22 January 1858 in Hanover – 8 September 1924 in Barsinghausen) was a German painter and art professor. He was the father of Pascual Jordan, one of the co-founders of quantum mechanics.

== Biography ==
He was descended from a Spanish cavalry officer who served with the British Army during the Napoleonic Wars and changed his name from "Jorda" to Jordan. Upon retirement, his family settled in Hanover. At that time the House of Hanover ruled England.

His initial training was as a decorative painter, at the local School of Applied Arts. He then worked as a theatre painter. In 1880, he began attending the School of Applied Arts in Berlin, followed by studies at the Prussian Academy of Art with Ernst Hildebrand.

In 1887, after spending a few years in Paris and Rome, he returned to Hanover and became a member of the Hannoverscher Künstlerverein. In 1895, he was appointed a lecturer for drawing and architectural painting at the Technischen Hochschule. Two years later, he took over management of the "Nude Room" at his alma mater, the School of Applied Arts, Hanover. He was appointed a "Professor Extraordinarius" at the Technischen Hochschule in 1899. After that, he became a teacher at the School of Applied Arts in Straßburg.

He continued to have great influence on the Hanoverian art scene through the 1920s. After World War I, he was a staunch opponent of modernist art movements and continued to promote what he felt were traditional styles. Reproductions of his works remained popular.
