= Creation and annihilation operators =

Operators useful in quantum mechanics

Creation operators and annihilation operators are mathematical operators that have widespread applications in quantum mechanics, notably in the study of quantum harmonic oscillators and many-particle systems. An annihilation operator (usually denoted $\hat{a}$) lowers the number of particles in a given state by one. A creation operator (usually denoted $\hat{a}^\dagger$) increases the number of particles in a given state by one, and it is the adjoint of the annihilation operator. In many subfields of physics and chemistry, the use of these operators instead of wavefunctions is known as second quantization. They were introduced by Paul Dirac.

Creation and annihilation operators can act on states of various types of particles. For example, in quantum chemistry and many-body theory the creation and annihilation operators often act on electron states. They can also refer specifically to the ladder operators for the quantum harmonic oscillator. In the latter case, the creation operator is interpreted as a raising operator, adding a quantum of energy to the oscillator system (similarly for the lowering operator). They can be used to represent phonons. Constructing Hamiltonians using these operators has the advantage that the theory automatically satisfies the cluster decomposition theorem.

The mathematics for the creation and annihilation operators for bosons is the same as for the ladder operators of the quantum harmonic oscillator. For example, the commutator of the creation and annihilation operators that are associated with the same boson state equals one, while all other commutators vanish. However, for fermions the mathematics is different, involving anticommutators instead of commutators.

== Ladder operators for the quantum harmonic oscillator ==
In the context of the quantum harmonic oscillator, one reinterprets the ladder operators as creation and annihilation operators, adding or subtracting fixed quanta of energy to the oscillator system.

Creation/annihilation operators are different for bosons (integer spin) and fermions (half-integer spin). This is because their wavefunctions have different symmetry properties.

First consider the simpler bosonic case of the photons of the quantum harmonic oscillator. Start with the Schrödinger equation for the one-dimensional time independent quantum harmonic oscillator,
$$\left(-\frac{\hbar^2}{2m} \frac{d^2}{d x^2} + \frac{1}{2}m \omega^2 x^2\right) \psi(x) = E \psi(x).$$

Make a coordinate substitution to nondimensionalize the differential equation
$$x \ = \ \sqrt{ \frac{\hbar}{m \omega}} q.$$

The Schrödinger equation for the oscillator becomes
$$\frac{\hbar \omega}{2} \left(-\frac{d^2}{d q^2} + q^2 \right) \psi(q) = E \psi(q).$$

Note that the quantity $\hbar \omega = h \nu$ is the same energy as that found for light quanta and that the parenthesis in the Hamiltonian can be written as
$$-\frac{d^2}{dq^2} + q^2 = \left(-\frac{d}{dq}+q \right) \left(\frac{d}{dq}+ q \right) + \frac {d}{dq}q - q \frac {d}{dq} .$$

The last two terms can be simplified by considering their effect on an arbitrary differentiable function $f(q),$

$$\left(\frac{d}{dq} q- q \frac{d}{dq} \right)f(q) = \frac{d}{dq}(q f(q)) - q \frac{df(q)}{dq} = f(q)$$
which implies,
$$\frac{d}{dq} q- q \frac{d}{dq} = 1 ,$$
coinciding with the usual canonical commutation relation $-i[q,p]=1$, in position space representation: $p:=-i\frac{d}{dq}$.

Therefore,
$$-\frac{d^2}{dq^2} + q^2 = \left(-\frac{d}{dq}+q \right) \left(\frac{d}{dq}+ q \right) + 1$$
and the Schrödinger equation for the oscillator becomes, with substitution of the above and rearrangement of the factor of 1/2,
$$\hbar \omega \left[\frac{1}{\sqrt{2}} \left(-\frac{d}{dq}+q \right)\frac{1}{\sqrt{2}} \left(\frac{d}{dq}+ q \right) + \frac{1}{2} \right] \psi(q) = E \psi(q).$$

If one defines
$$a^\dagger \ = \ \frac{1}{\sqrt{2}} \left(-\frac{d}{dq} + q\right)$$
as the "creation operator" or the "raising operator" and
$$a \ \ = \ \frac{1}{\sqrt{2}} \left(\frac{d}{dq} + q\right)$$
as the "annihilation operator" or the "lowering operator", the Schrödinger equation for the oscillator reduces to
$$\hbar \omega \left( a^\dagger a + \frac{1}{2} \right) \psi(q) = E \psi(q).$$
This is significantly simpler than the original form. Further simplifications of this equation enable one to derive all the properties listed above thus far.

Letting $p = - i \frac{d}{dq}$, where $p$ is the nondimensionalized momentum operator, one has

$$[q, p] = i \,$$
and
$$\begin{align}
a &= \frac{1}{\sqrt{2}}(q + i p) = \frac{1}{\sqrt{2}}\left( q + \frac{d}{dq}\right) \\[1ex]
a^\dagger &= \frac{1}{\sqrt{2}}(q - i p) = \frac{1}{\sqrt{2}}\left( q - \frac{d}{dq}\right).
\end{align}$$

Note that these imply
$$[a, a^\dagger ] = \frac{1}{2} [ q + ip , q-i p] = \frac{1}{2} ([q,-ip] + [ip, q]) = -\frac{i}{2} ([q, p] + [q, p]) = 1.$$

The operators $a\,$ and $a^\dagger\,$ may be contrasted to normal operators, which commute with their adjoints. (Note: A normal operator has a representation A= B + i C, where B,C are self-adjoint and commute, i.e. $BC=CB$. By contrast, a has the representation $a=q+ip$ where $p,q$ are self-adjoint but $[p,q]=1$. Then B and C have a common set of eigenfunctions (and are simultaneously diagonalizable), whereas p and q famously don't and aren't.)

Using the commutation relations given above, the Hamiltonian operator can be expressed as
$$\hat H = \hbar \omega \left( a \, a^\dagger - \frac{1}{2}\right) = \hbar \omega \left( a^\dagger \, a + \frac{1}{2}\right).\qquad\qquad(*)$$

One may compute the commutation relations between the $a\,$ and $a^\dagger\,$ operators and the Hamiltonian:
$$\begin{align}
\left[\hat H, a \right] &= \left[\hbar \omega \left ( a a^\dagger - \tfrac{1}{2}\right ) , a\right] = \hbar \omega \left[ a a^\dagger, a\right] = \hbar \omega \left( a [a^\dagger,a] + [a,a] a^\dagger\right) = -\hbar \omega a. \\[1ex]
\left[\hat H, a^\dagger \right] &= \hbar \omega \, a^\dagger .
\end{align}$$

These relations can be used to easily find all the energy eigenstates of the quantum harmonic oscillator as follows.

Assuming that $\psi_n$ is an eigenstate of the Hamiltonian $\hat H \psi_n = E_n\, \psi_n$. Using these commutation relations, it follows that
$$\begin{align}
\hat H\, a\psi_n &= (E_n - \hbar \omega)\, a\psi_n . \\[1ex]
\hat H\, a^\dagger\psi_n &= (E_n + \hbar \omega)\, a^\dagger\psi_n .
\end{align}$$

This shows that $a\psi_n$ and $a^\dagger\psi_n$ are also eigenstates of the Hamiltonian, with eigenvalues $E_n - \hbar \omega$ and $E_n + \hbar \omega$ respectively. This identifies the operators $a$ and $a^\dagger$ as "lowering" and "raising" operators between adjacent eigenstates. The energy difference between adjacent eigenstates is $\Delta E = \hbar \omega$.

The ground state can be found by assuming that the lowering operator possesses a nontrivial kernel: $a\, \psi_0 = 0$ with $\psi_0\ne0$. Applying the Hamiltonian to the ground state,

$$\hat H\psi_0 = \hbar\omega\left(a^\dagger a+\frac{1}{2}\right)\psi_0 = \hbar\omega a^\dagger a \psi_0 + \frac{\hbar\omega}{2}\psi_0=0+\frac{\hbar\omega}{2}\psi_0=E_0\psi_0.$$
So $\psi_0$ is an eigenfunction of the Hamiltonian.

This gives the ground state energy $E_0 = \hbar \omega /2$, which allows one to identify the energy eigenvalue of any eigenstate $\psi_n$ as
$$E_n = \left(n + \tfrac{1}{2}\right)\hbar \omega.$$

Furthermore, it turns out that the first-mentioned operator in (*), the number operator $N=a^\dagger a\,,$ plays the most important role in applications, while the second one, $a a^\dagger \,$ can simply be replaced by $N+1$.

Consequently,
$$\hbar\omega \,\left(N+\tfrac{1}{2}\right)\,\psi (q) =E\,\psi (q)~.$$

The time-evolution operator is then
$$\begin{align}
U(t)
&= \exp ( -it \hat{H}/\hbar)
= \exp (-it\omega (a^\dagger a+1/2)) ~, \\[1ex]
&= e^{-it \omega /2} ~ \sum_{k=0}^{\infty} {(e^{-i\omega t}-1)^k \over k!} a^{{\dagger} {k}} a^k ~.
\end{align}$$

=== Explicit eigenfunctions ===
The ground state $\ \psi_0(q)$ of the quantum harmonic oscillator can be found by imposing the condition that
$$a \ \psi_0(q) = 0.$$

Written out as a differential equation, the wavefunction satisfies
$$q \psi_0 + \frac{d\psi_0}{dq} = 0$$
with the solution
$$\psi_0(q) = C \exp\left(-\tfrac 1 2 q^2\right).$$

The normalization constant C is found to be $1/ \sqrt[4]{\pi}$ from $\int_{-\infty}^\infty \psi_0^* \psi_0 \,dq = 1$, using the Gaussian integral. Explicit formulas for all the eigenfunctions can now be found by repeated application of $a^\dagger$ to $\psi_0$.

=== Matrix representation ===
The matrix expression of the creation and annihilation operators of the quantum harmonic oscillator with respect to the above orthonormal basis is
$$\begin{align}
a^\dagger &= \begin{pmatrix}
0 & 0 & 0 & 0 & \dots & 0 & \dots \\
\sqrt{1} & 0 & 0 & 0 & \dots & 0 & \dots \\
0 & \sqrt{2} & 0 & 0 & \dots & 0 & \dots \\
0 & 0 & \sqrt{3} & 0 & \dots & 0 & \dots \\
\vdots & \vdots & \vdots & \ddots & \ddots & \dots & \dots \\
0 & 0 & 0 & \dots & \sqrt{n} & 0 & \dots & \\
\vdots & \vdots & \vdots & \vdots & \vdots & \ddots & \ddots \end{pmatrix}
\\[1ex]
a &= \begin{pmatrix}
0 & \sqrt{1} & 0 & 0 & \dots & 0 & \dots \\
0 & 0 & \sqrt{2} & 0 & \dots & 0 & \dots \\
0 & 0 & 0 & \sqrt{3} & \dots & 0 & \dots \\
0 & 0 & 0 & 0 & \ddots & \vdots & \dots \\
\vdots & \vdots & \vdots & \vdots & \ddots & \sqrt{n} & \dots \\
0 & 0 & 0 & 0 & \dots & 0 & \ddots \\
\vdots & \vdots & \vdots & \vdots & \vdots & \vdots & \ddots \end{pmatrix}
\end{align}$$

These can be obtained via the relationships $a^\dagger_{ij} = \left\langle\psi_i \right| a^\dagger \left| \psi_j\right\rangle$ and $a_{ij} = \left\langle\psi_i \right| a \left| \psi_j\right\rangle$. The eigenvectors $\psi_i$ are those of the quantum harmonic oscillator, and are sometimes called the "number basis".

== Generalized creation and annihilation operators ==
Thanks to representation theory and C*-algebras the operators derived above are actually a specific instance of a more generalized notion of creation and annihilation operators in the context of CCR and CAR algebras. Mathematically and even more generally ladder operators can be understood in the context of a root system of a semisimple Lie group and the associated semisimple Lie algebra without the need of realizing the representation as operators on a functional Hilbert space.

In the Hilbert space representation case the operators are constructed as follows. Let $H$ be a one-particle Hilbert space (that is, any Hilbert space, viewed as representing the state of a single particle).

=== Bosonic CCR algebra ===
The (bosonic) CCR algebra over $H$ is the algebra-with-conjugation-operator (called *) abstractly generated by elements $a(f)$, where $f\,$ranges freely over $H$, subject to the relations

$$\begin{align}
\left[a(f), a(g)\right] &= \left[a^\dagger(f), a^\dagger(g)\right] = 0 \\[1ex]
\left[a(f), a^\dagger(g)\right] &= \langle f\mid g \rangle,
\end{align}$$
in bra–ket notation.

The map $a: f \to a(f)$ from $H$ to the bosonic CCR algebra is required to be complex antilinear (this adds more relations). Its adjoint is $a^\dagger(f)$, and the map $f\to a^\dagger(f)$ is complex linear in H. Thus $H$ embeds as a complex vector subspace of its own CCR algebra. In a representation of this algebra, the element $a(f)$ will be realized as an annihilation operator, and $a^\dagger(f)$ as a creation operator.

In general, the CCR algebra is infinite dimensional. If we take a Banach space completion, it becomes a C*-algebra. The CCR algebra over $H$ is closely related to, but not identical to, a Weyl algebra.

=== Fermionic CAR algebra ===
For fermions, the (fermionic) CAR algebra over $H$ is constructed similarly, but using anticommutator relations instead, namely

$$\begin{align}
\{a(f),a(g)\} &= \{a^\dagger(f),a^\dagger(g)\} = 0 \\[1ex]
\{a(f),a^\dagger(g)\} &= \langle f\mid g \rangle.
\end{align}$$

The CAR algebra is finite dimensional only if $H$ is finite dimensional. If we take a Banach space completion (only necessary in the infinite dimensional case), it becomes a $C^*$ algebra. The CAR algebra is closely related, but not identical to, a Clifford algebra.

Physically speaking, $a(f)$ removes (i.e. annihilates) a particle in the state $|f\rangle$ whereas $a^\dagger(f)$ creates a particle in the state $|f\rangle$.

The free field vacuum state is the state $\left\vert0\right\rangle$ with no particles, characterized by
$$a(f) \left| 0\right\rangle=0.$$

If $|f\rangle$ is normalized so that $\langle f|f\rangle = 1$, then $N=a^\dagger(f)a(f)$ gives the number of particles in the state $|f\rangle$.

== In reaction-diffusion equations ==
The annihilation and creation operator description has also been useful to analyze classical reaction diffusion equations, such as the situation when a gas of molecules $A$ diffuse and interact on contact, forming an inert product: $A+A\to \empty$. To see how this kind of reaction can be described by the annihilation and creation operator formalism, consider $n_{i}$ particles at a site i on a one dimensional lattice. Each particle moves to the right or left with a certain probability, and each pair of particles at the same site annihilates each other with a certain other probability.

The probability that one particle leaves the site during the short time period dt is proportional to $n_i \, dt$, let us say a probability $\alpha n_{i}dt$ to hop left and $\alpha n_i \, dt$ to hop right. All $n_i$ particles will stay put with a probability $1-2\alpha n_i \, dt$. (Since dt is so short, the probability that two or more will leave during dt is very small and will be ignored.)

We can now describe the occupation of particles on the lattice as a 'ket' of the form $|\dots, n_{-1}, n_0, n_1, \dots\rangle$. It represents the juxtaposition (or conjunction, or tensor product) of the number states $\dots, |n_{-1}\rangle$, $|n_{0}\rangle$, $|n_{1}\rangle, \dots$ located at the individual sites of the lattice. Recall that

$$a\left| n \right\rangle = \sqrt{n} \left|n-1\right\rangle$$
and
$$a^\dagger \left| n\right\rangle= \sqrt{n+1}\left| n+1\right\rangle,$$
for all n ≥ 0, while
$$[a,a^{\dagger}] = \mathbf 1$$

This definition of the operators will now be changed to accommodate the "non-quantum" nature of this problem and we shall use the following definition:

$$\begin{align}
a \left|n\right\rangle &= (n) \left|n{-}1\right\rangle \\[1ex]
a^\dagger \left|n\right\rangle &=  \left| n{+}1\right\rangle
\end{align}$$

note that even though the behavior of the operators on the kets has been modified, these operators still obey the commutation relation
$$[a,a^{\dagger}]=\mathbf 1$$

Now define $a_i$ so that it applies $a$ to $|n_i\rangle$. Correspondingly, define $a^\dagger_i$ as applying $a^\dagger$ to $|n_i\rangle$. Thus, for example, the net effect of $a_{i-1} a^\dagger_i$ is to move a particle from the $(i-1)$-th to the i-th site while multiplying with the appropriate factor.

This allows writing the pure diffusive behavior of the particles as
$$\partial_{t}\left| \psi\right\rangle
= -\alpha \sum_i \left(2a_i^\dagger a_i-a_{i-1}^\dagger a_i-a_{i+1}^\dagger a_i\right) \left|\psi\right\rangle
= -\alpha\sum_i \left(a_i^\dagger-a_{i-1}^\dagger\right)(a_i-a_{i-1}) \left|\psi\right\rangle.$$

The reaction term can be deduced by noting that $n$ particles can interact in $n(n-1)$ different ways, so that the probability that a pair annihilates is $\lambda n(n-1)dt$, yielding a term
$$\lambda \sum_i (a_i a_i-a_i^\dagger a_i^\dagger a_i a_i)$$

where number state n is replaced by number state n − 2 at site $i$ at a certain rate.

Thus the state evolves by
$$\partial_t\left|\psi\right\rangle = -\alpha\sum_i \left(a_i^\dagger-a_{i-1}^\dagger\right) \left(a_i-a_{i-1}\right) \left|\psi\right\rangle + \lambda\sum_i \left(a_i^2-a_i^{\dagger 2}a_i^2\right) \left|\psi\right\rangle$$

Other kinds of interactions can be included in a similar manner.

This kind of notation allows the use of quantum field theoretic techniques to be used in the analysis of reaction diffusion systems.

== In quantum field theories ==
In quantum field theories and many-body problems one works with creation and annihilation operators of quantum states, $a^\dagger_i$ and $a^{\,}_i$. These operators change the eigenvalues of the number operator,
$$N = \sum_i n_i = \sum_i a^\dagger_i a^{\,}_i,$$
by one, in analogy to the harmonic oscillator. The indices (such as $i$) represent quantum numbers that label the single-particle states of the system; hence, they are not necessarily single numbers. For example, a tuple of quantum numbers $(n, \ell, m, s)$ is used to label states in the hydrogen atom.

The commutation relations of creation and annihilation operators in a multiple-boson system are,
$$\begin{align}
\left[a^{\,}_i, a^\dagger_j\right] &\equiv a^{\,}_i a^\dagger_j - a^\dagger_ja^{\,}_i = \delta_{i j}, \\[1ex]
\left[a^\dagger_i, a^\dagger_j\right] &= [a^{\,}_i, a^{\,}_j] = 0,
\end{align}$$
where $[\cdot , \cdot ]$ is the commutator and $\delta_{i j}$ is the Kronecker delta.

For fermions, the commutator is replaced by the anticommutator $\{\cdot , \cdot \}$,
$$\begin{align}
\{a^{\,}_i, a^\dagger_j\} &\equiv a^{\,}_i a^\dagger_j +a^\dagger_j a^{\,}_i = \delta_{i j}, \\[1ex]
\{a^\dagger_i, a^\dagger_j\} &= \{a^{\,}_i, a^{\,}_j\} = 0.
\end{align}$$
Therefore, exchanging disjoint (i.e. $i \ne j$) operators in a product of creation or annihilation operators will reverse the sign in fermion systems, but not in boson systems.

If the states labelled by i are an orthonormal basis of a Hilbert space H, then the result of this construction coincides with the CCR algebra and CAR algebra construction in the previous section but one. If they represent "eigenvectors" corresponding to the continuous spectrum of some operator, as for unbound particles in QFT, then the interpretation is more subtle.

=== Normalization conventions ===
While Zee obtains the momentum space normalization $[\hat a_{\mathbf p},\hat a_{\mathbf q}^\dagger] = \delta(\mathbf{p} - \mathbf{q})$ via the symmetric convention for Fourier transforms, Tong and Peskin & Schroeder use the common asymmetric convention to obtain $[\hat a_{\mathbf p},\hat a_{\mathbf q}^\dagger] = (2\pi)^3\delta(\mathbf{p} - \mathbf{q})$. Each derives $[\hat \phi(\mathbf x), \hat \pi(\mathbf x')] = i\delta(\mathbf x - \mathbf x')$.

Srednicki additionally merges the Lorentz-invariant measure into his asymmetric Fourier measure, $\tilde{dk}=\frac{d^3k}{(2\pi)^3 2\omega}$, yielding $[\hat a_{\mathbf k},\hat a_{\mathbf k'}^\dagger] = (2\pi)^3 2\omega\,\delta(\mathbf{k} - \mathbf{k}')$.

== See also ==
- Fock space
- Segal–Bargmann space
- Optical phase space
- Coherent state
- Bogoliubov–Valatin transformation
- Holstein–Primakoff transformation
- Jordan–Wigner transformation
- Jordan–Schwinger transformation
- Klein transformation
- Canonical commutation relations
