= Carlo Di Castro =

Italian theoretical physicist

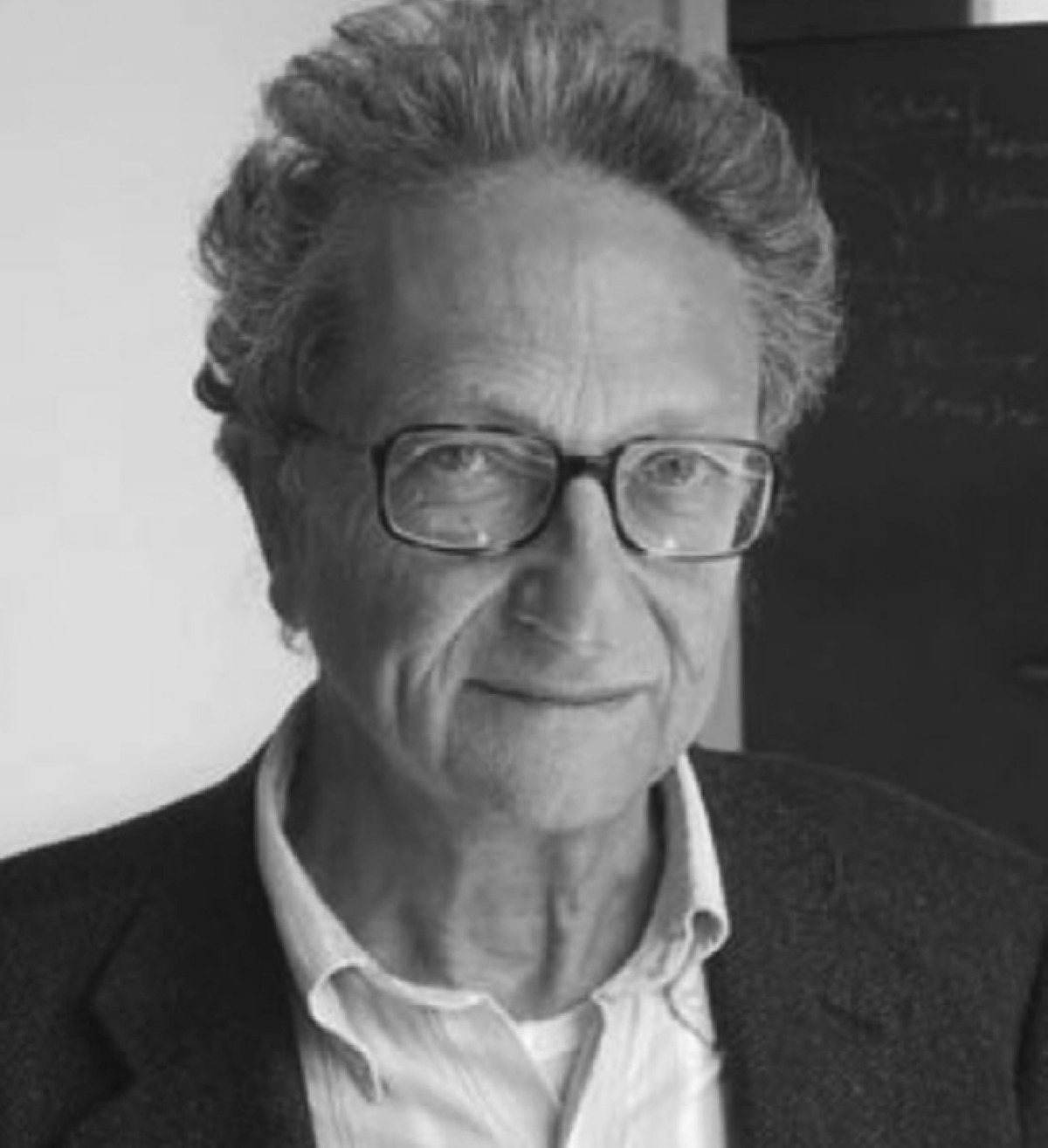
- Born: 14 August 1937; Rome, Italy
- Education: Sapienza University of Rome; University of Birmingham
- Awards: Presidential Gold Medal for services to education and culture (2003); Humboldt Research Award (2004); Meritorious Member of the Italian Physical Society (2015)
- Scientific career
- Workplaces: Sapienza University of Rome, UNiversity of L'Aquila

Carlo Di Castro (born 14 August 1937) is an Italian theoretical physicist in the field of statistical mechanics, superconductivity, and condensed matter physics. He is a patriarch of Italian theoretical condensed matter physics, founder of the condensed matter Rome group (together with Claudio Castellani), full member of the Accademia dei Lincei (1997), and emeritus professor of Sapienza University of Rome. In 1969, Di Castro, in co-authorship with Giovanni Jona-Lasinio, introduced the renormalization group approach into the study of critical phenomena (almost two years before the celebrated papers by Kenneth G. Wilson, laureate of the Nobel Prize in Physics in 1982), providing a first example of complexity in physical systems.

== Early life, education, and professional career ==
Carlo Di Castro was born in Rome to a Jewish family. During World War II he had a traumatic experience having to flee his home and going into hiding using assumed names. He summarizes his experience with the sentence: "the fear of the unknown must be overcome through knowledge and reason." In 1956, he started his studies in Rome at Sapienza University at the college of engineering for the first two years, but then decided to devote himself to physics. In 1961, after submitting his thesis on superfluid Helium, he received a laurea degree. Di Castro continued his studies in Birmingham entering the warm community surrounding R. E. Peierls. In 1964, under the supervision of John George Valatin, he was awarded a Ph.D. in mathematical physics for his thesis devoted to the behavior of thin superconducting films in magnetic fields. In 1965, Di Castro joined the Rome division of the National Institute of Nuclear Physics. He was full professor in condensed matter physics at the University of L'Aquila in 1976/77 and since 1978, in statistical mechanics at Sapienza University of Rome (further details can be found in the interview article The beginnings of theoretical condensed matter physics in Rome: a personal remembrance). With Roberto Raimondi, Carlo Di Castro authorised the volume Statistical Mechanics and Applications in Condensed Matter.

== Research interests and highlights ==
Carlo Di Castro's main research interest has been the understanding of collective properties of condensed matter and many-body systems, whose behavior cannot be explained in terms of single particle paradigms and whose emergent low energy properties are qualitatively different from those of non-interacting systems. Particular attention has been given to the phenomenology of superfluid Helium & superconductivity, criticality & quantum criticality, strongly correlated and disordered electron systems, metal-insulator transitions, and high-temperature superconductors. He has pioneered the renormalization group (RG) approach to critical phenomena providing the basis for the derivation of the scaling theory of critical phenomena in 1969. The initiating role of this paper can be seen, e.g., in Wilson's Nobel Lecture. His approach was summarized in . In 1971 he developed the first field theoretical formulation of the famous ε-expansion by K. G. Wilson and M. E. Fisher to calculate critical exponents.

He extended the RG approach to quantum Bose and anomalous Fermi-Luttinger liquids. In the former problem he tackled the long-standing problem of three-dimensional infrared singularities in the calculation of the quasi-particle spectrum of superfluid Helium. For the Fermi case - in contradiction to Anderson's proposal for strange metal behavior in high-temperature superconductors - he studied the crossover between the one-dimensional Luttinger liquid to Landau-Fermi liquids in higher dimensions.

The interplay between Mott metal-insulator transition due to correlations and Anderson localization due to disorder was considered one of the main open problems in the 1980s. Di Castro used symmetry properties of the Hubbard Hamiltonian to characterize the order parameter of the Mott transition and, using renormalization group and symmetry properties, made key contributions to the theory of interacting disordered electron systems beyond Anderson localization. The achievements in this field are well represented in the proceedings of the International Symposium held in Tokio August 16–18, 1987. The problem of the existence of a disordered metallic phase in two-dimensions (which is still unresolved) was also addressed.

His research group proposed in the 1990s a scenario of high-temperature cuprate superconductors and of their anomalous metallic state based on phase separation and charge density wave order with quantum criticality, which was ahead of its time. Since 2012, charge density wave order has been observed routinely in cuprates and is now the most studied phenomenon among competing orders. Recently, Di Castro proposed that the violation of the Fermi liquid paradigm and the formation of the so-called strange metal state in cuprates and other materials near quantum critical points, arise from nearly overdamped charge fluctuations of the local order parameter.

== Honors and awards ==
- Member of the IUPAP Condensed Matter Physics Commission (1993–1999).
- Presidential Gold Medal for services to education and culture (2003).
- Humboldt Research Award in recognition of his accomplishments in research and teaching (2004)
- Meritorious Member of the Italian Physical Society (2015).

== Publications ==
- Carlo Di Castro publications indexed by Google Scholar
