= Holstein–Primakoff transformation =

Transformation in quantum mechanics

In quantum mechanics, the Holstein–Primakoff transformation is a mapping from boson creation and annihilation operators to the spin operators, effectively truncating their infinite-dimensional Fock space to finite-dimensional subspaces.

One important aspect of quantum mechanics is the occurrence of—in general—non-commuting operators which represent observables, quantities that can be measured. A standard example of a set of such operators are the three components of the angular momentum operators, which are crucial in many quantum systems. These operators are complicated, and one would like to find a simpler representation, which can be used to generate approximate calculational schemes.

The transformation was developed in 1940 by Theodore Holstein, a graduate student at the time, and Henry Primakoff. This method has found widespread applicability and has been extended in many different directions.

There is a close link to other methods of boson mapping of operator algebras: in particular, the (non-Hermitian) Dyson–Maleev technique, and to a lesser extent the Jordan–Schwinger map. There is, furthermore, a close link to the theory of (generalized) coherent states in Lie algebras.

== Description ==
The basic idea can be illustrated for the basic example of spin operators of quantum mechanics.

For any set of right-handed orthogonal axes, define the components of this vector operator as $S_x$, $S_y$ and $S_z$, which are mutually noncommuting, i.e., $\left[S_x,S_y\right] = i\hbar S_z$ and its cyclic permutations.

In order to uniquely specify the states of a spin, one may diagonalise any set of commuting operators. Normally one uses the SU(2) Casimir operators $S^2$ and $S_z$, which leads to states with the quantum numbers $\left|s,m_s\right\rangle$,

$$S^2\left|s,m_s\right\rangle=\hbar^2 s(s+1) \left|s,m_s\right\rangle,$$
$$S_z\left|s,m_s\right\rangle=\hbar m_s\left|s,m_s\right\rangle.$$

The projection quantum number $m_s$ takes on all the values $(-s, -s+1, \ldots ,s-1, s)$.

Consider a single particle of spin s (i.e., look at a single irreducible representation of SU(2)). Now take the state with maximal projection $\left|s,m_s= +s\right\rangle$, the extremal weight state as a vacuum for a set of boson operators, and each subsequent state with lower projection quantum number as a boson excitation of the previous one,

$$\left|s,s-n\right\rangle\mapsto \frac{1}{\sqrt{n!}}\left(a^\dagger\right)^n|0\rangle_B   ~.$$

Each additional boson then corresponds to a decrease of ħ in the spin projection. Thus, the spin raising and lowering operators $S_+= S_x + i S_y$ and $S_- = S_x - i S_y$, so that $[S_+,S_-]=2\hbar S_z$, correspond (in the sense detailed below) to the bosonic annihilation and creation operators, respectively. The precise relations between the operators must be chosen to ensure the correct commutation relations for the spin operators, such that they act on a finite-dimensional space, unlike the original Fock space.

The resulting Holstein–Primakoff transformation can be written as

$S_+ = \hbar \sqrt{2s} \sqrt{1-\frac{a^\dagger a}{2s}}\, a ~, \qquad S_- = \hbar \sqrt{2s} a^\dagger\, \sqrt{1-\frac{a^\dagger a}{2s}} ~, \qquad S_z = \hbar(s - a^\dagger a) ~.$

The transformation is particularly useful in the case where s is large, when the square roots can be expanded as Taylor series, to give an expansion in decreasing powers of s.

Alternatively to a Taylor expansion there has been recent progress with a resummation of the series that made expressions possible that are polynomial in bosonic operators but still mathematically exact (on the physical subspace). The first method develops a resummation method that is exact for spin $s=1/2$, while the latter employs a Newton series (a finite difference) expansion with an identical result, as shown below

$S_+^{(1/2)}= \hbar \sqrt{2s}\left[1+\left(\sqrt{1-\frac{1}{2 s}}-1\right)a^\dagger a\right]a, \qquad S_-^{(1/2)} = (S_+^{(1/2)})^\dagger, \qquad S_z^{(1/2)} = \hbar(s - a^\dagger a) ~.$

While the expression above is not exact for spins higher than 1/2 it is an improvement over the Taylor series. Exact expressions also exist for higher spins and include $2s+1$ terms. Much like the result above also for the expressions of higher spins $S_+ = S_-^\dagger$ and therefore the resummation is hermitian.

There also exists a non-Hermitian Dyson–Maleev (by Freeman Dyson and S.V. Maleev) variant realization J is related to the above and valid for all spins,

$$J_+ = \hbar \, a ~, \qquad
J_-=  S_- ~  \sqrt{2s-a^\dagger a} = \hbar  a^\dagger\, (2s-a^\dagger a)~, \qquad
J_z=S_z = \hbar(s - a^\dagger a) ~,$$

satisfying the same commutation relations and characterized by the same Casimir invariant.

The technique can be further extended to the Witt algebra, which is the centerless Virasoro algebra.

== See also ==
- Spin wave
- Jordan–Wigner transformation
- Jordan–Schwinger transformation
- Bogoliubov–Valatin transformation
- Klein transformation
- Schwinger boson representation
