= Pascual Jordan =

German physicist and politician (1902–1980)

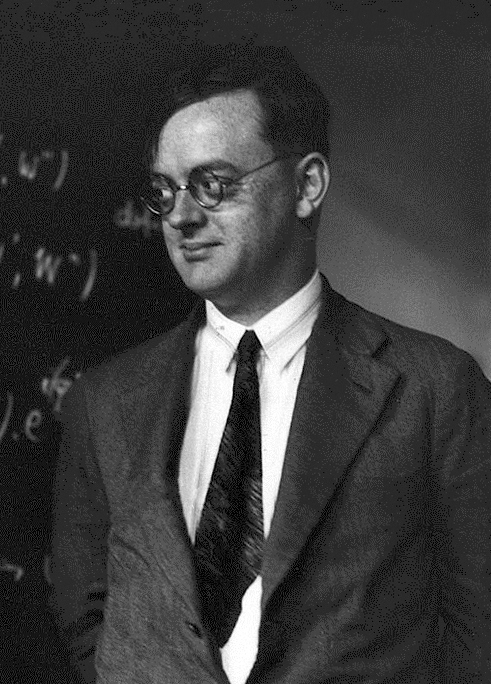
- Pascual Jordan in the 1920s
- Born: Ernst Pascual Jordan; 18 October 1902; Hannover, Kingdom of Prussia, German Empire
- Died: 31 July 1980 (aged 77); Hamburg, West Germany
- Education: Technical University of Hannover; University of Göttingen
- Known for: Quantum mechanics Quantum field theory Canonical commutation relation Matrix mechanics Neutrino theory of light Zero-energy universe Skew lattice Jordan algebra Jordan–Brans–Dicke theory Jordan and Einstein frames Jordan map Jordan–Wigner transformation Pauli–Jordan function
- Awards: Ackermann–Teubner Memorial Award (1937); Max Planck Medal (1942); Konrad Adenauer Prize (1971)
- Scientific career
- Fields: Theoretical physics
- Workplaces: University of Rostock; University of Berlin; University of Hamburg
- Doctoral advisor: Max Born
- Doctoral students: Jürgen Ehlers; Engelbert Schücking; Wolfgang Kundt

Ernst Pascual Jordan (German: [ˈɛʁnst pasˈku̯al ˈjɔʁdan]; 18 October 1902 – 31 July 1980) was a German theoretical and mathematical physicist who co-founded and made significant contributions to quantum mechanics and quantum field theory. He contributed much to the mathematical form of matrix mechanics, and developed canonical anticommutation relations for fermions. He introduced Jordan algebras in an effort to formalize quantum field theory; the algebras have since found numerous applications within mathematics.

Jordan joined the Nazi Party in 1933, but did not follow the Deutsche Physik movement, which at the time rejected quantum physics developed by Albert Einstein and other Jewish physicists. After the Second World War, he entered politics for the conservative party CDU and served as a member of parliament from 1957 to 1961.

== Family history and education ==
Jordan was born to Ernst Pasqual Jordan (1858–1924) and Eva Fischer. Ernst Jordan was a painter renowned for his portraits and landscapes. He was an associate professor of art at Hannover Technical University when his son was born. The family name was originally Jorda and it was of Spanish origin. The first born sons were all given the name Pasqual or the version Pascual. The family settled in Hannover after Napoleon's defeat at the Battle of Waterloo in 1815 and at some stage changed their name from Jorda to Jordan. Ernst Jordan married Eva Fischer in 1892.

An ancestor of Pascual Jordan named Pascual Jordan was a Spanish nobleman and cavalry officer who served with the British during and after the Napoleonic Wars. Jordan eventually settled in Hannover. In those days the House of Hanover ruled the United Kingdom. The family name was eventually changed to Jordan (pronounced in the German manner, [ˈjɔʁdaːn]). A family tradition held that the first-born son in each generation be named Pascual. Jordan was raised with a traditional religious upbringing. At age 12 he attempted to reconcile a literal interpretation of the Bible with Darwinian evolution; his teacher of religion convinced him there was no contradiction between science and religion (Jordan would write numerous articles on the relationship between the two throughout his life).

Jordan enrolled in the Technical University of Hannover in 1921 where he studied zoology, mathematics, and physics. As was typical for a German university student of the time, he shifted his studies to another university before obtaining a degree. The University of Göttingen, his destination in 1923, was then at the very zenith of its powers in mathematics and the physical sciences, such as under the guidance of mathematician David Hilbert and the physicist Arnold Sommerfeld. At Göttingen, Jordan became an assistant to the mathematician Richard Courant for a time, and then he studied physics under Max Born and heredity under geneticist and race scientist Alfred Kühn for his doctorate.

Jordan suffered a speech impairment throughout his life, often stuttering badly when giving unprepared remarks. In 1926, Niels Bohr offered to pay to treat it, and on the advice of Wilhelm Lenz, Jordan sought treatment at Alfred Adler's clinic in Vienna.

== Scientific work ==
Together with Max Born and Werner Heisenberg, Jordan was a coauthor of an important series of papers on quantum mechanics. He went on to pioneer early quantum field theory before largely switching his focus to cosmology before World War II.

Jordan devised a type of nonassociative algebras, now named Jordan algebras, in an attempt to create an algebra of observables for quantum mechanics and quantum field theory. While the algebras proved not to be useful for that purpose, they have since found numerous applications within mathematics. Jordan algebras have been applied in projective geometry, number theory, complex analysis, optimization, and many other fields of pure and applied mathematics.

In 1966, Jordan published his 182-page work Die Expansion der Erde. Folgerungen aus der Diracschen Gravitationshypothese (The expansion of the Earth. Conclusions from the Dirac gravitation hypothesis) in which he developed his theory that, according to Paul Dirac's hypothesis of a steady weakening of gravitation throughout the history of the universe, the Earth may have swollen to its current size, from an initial ball of a diameter of only about 7,000 kilometres (4,300 mi). This theory could explain why the ductile lower sima layer of the Earth's crust is of a comparatively uniform thickness, while the brittle upper sial layer of the Earth's crust had broken apart into the main continental plates. The continents having to adapt to the ever flatter surface of the growing ball, the mountain ranges on the Earth's surface would, in the course of that, have come into being as constricted folds. Despite the energy Jordan invested in the expanding Earth theory, his geological work was never taken seriously by either physicists or geologists.

== Political activities ==
Germany's defeat in the First World War and the Treaty of Versailles had a profound effect on Jordan's political beliefs. While many of his colleagues believed the Treaty to be unjust, Jordan went much further and became increasingly nationalistic and right-wing. He wrote numerous articles in the late 1920s that propounded an aggressive and bellicose stance. He was an anti-communist and was particularly concerned about the Russian Revolution and the rise of the Bolsheviks. He wrote articles in several far-right journals under the pseudonym Ernst Domeier, as was revealed in the 1990s.

In 1933, Jordan joined the Nazi party, like Philipp Lenard and Johannes Stark, and, moreover, joined an SA unit. He supported the Nazis' nationalism and anti-communism but at the same time, he remained "a defender of Einstein" and other Jewish scientists. Jordan seemed to hope that he could influence the new regime; one of his projects was attempting to convince the Nazis that modern physics developed as represented by Einstein and especially the new Copenhagen brand of quantum theory could be the antidote to the "materialism of the Bolsheviks". However, while the Nazis appreciated his support for them, his continued support for Jewish scientists and their theories led him to be regarded as politically unreliable.

Jordan enlisted in the Luftwaffe in 1939 and worked as a weather analyst at the Peenemünde rocket center, for a while. During the war he attempted to interest the Nazi party in various schemes for advanced weapons. His suggestions were ignored because he was considered "politically unreliable", probably because of his past associations with Jews (in particular: Born, Richard Courant and Wolfgang Pauli) and the so-called "Jewish physics". Responding to Ludwig Bieberbach, Jordan wrote: "The differences among German and French mathematics are not any more essential than the differences between German and French machine guns."

Immediately after the war, Jordan wrote a letter to Bohr to "give a short coherent account of what I did during these black 12 years", painting emigration as impractical due to his mother's ill health and his speech impediment, before outlining the difficulties he faced as a high-profile student of emigré teachers. As an example of his work pushing back against Nazi ideology, he claimed that his book Physics of the Twentieth Century was an "attack" on Rosenberg's Myth of the twentieth century that risked landing him in the crosshairs of the SS. He went on to draw a sharp distinction between German militarism and Nazism proper, citing the July 20 plot as evidence.

Wolfgang Pauli declared Jordan to be "rehabilitated" to the West German authorities some time after the war, allowing him to regain academic employment after a two-year period. In 1953, after a successful application for relief (including a salary subsidy) under Article 131, he recovered his full status as a tenured professor at the University of Hamburg, where he stayed until he became emeritus in 1971.

Jordan went against Pauli's advice, and reentered politics after the period of denazification came to an end under the pressures of the Cold War. In 1957 he secured election to the Bundestag standing with the conservative Christian Democratic Union. In 1957 Jordan supported the arming of the Bundeswehr with tactical nuclear weapons by the Adenauer government, while the Göttingen Eighteen (a group of German physicists which included Born and Heisenberg) issued the Göttinger Manifest in protest. This and other issues were to further strain his relationships with his former friends and colleagues.

== Selected works ==
- Born, M.; Jordan, P. (1925). "Zur Quantenmechanik". Zeitschrift für Physik. 34 (1): 858. Bibcode:1925ZPhy...34..858B. doi:10.1007/BF01328531. S2CID 186114542.
- Born, M.; Heisenberg, W.; Jordan, P. (1926). "Zur Quantenmechanik. II". Zeitschrift für Physik. 35 (8–9): 557. Bibcode:1926ZPhy...35..557B. doi:10.1007/BF01379806. S2CID 186237037.
- Jordan, P. (1927). "Über quantenmechanische Darstellung von Quantensprüngen". Zeitschrift für Physik. 40 (9): 661–666. Bibcode:1927ZPhy...40..661J. doi:10.1007/BF01451860. S2CID 122253028.
- Jordan, P. (1927). "Über eine neue Begründung der Quantenmechanik". Zeitschrift für Physik. 40 (11–12): 809–838. Bibcode:1927ZPhy...40..809J. doi:10.1007/BF01390903. S2CID 121258722.
- Jordan, P. (1927). "Kausalität und Statistik in der modernen Physik". Die Naturwissenschaften. 15 (5): 105–110. Bibcode:1927NW.....15..105J. doi:10.1007/BF01504228. S2CID 26167543.
- Jordan, P. (1927). "Anmerkung zur statistischen Deutung der Quantenmechanik". Zeitschrift für Physik. 41 (4–5): 797–800. Bibcode:1927ZPhy...41..797J. doi:10.1007/BF01395485. S2CID 121174605.
- Jordan, P. (1927). "Über eine neue Begründung der Quantenmechanik II". Zeitschrift für Physik. 44 (1–2): 1–25. Bibcode:1927ZPhy...44....1J. doi:10.1007/BF01391714. S2CID 186228140.
- Jordan, P.; von Neumann, J.; Wigner, E. (1934). "On an Algebraic Generalization of the Quantum Mechanical Formalism". Annals of Mathematics. 35 (1): 29–64. doi:10.2307/1968117. JSTOR 1968117.
