= Klein transformation =

Type of field redefinition

In quantum field theory, the Klein transformation is a redefinition of the fields to amend the spin-statistics theorem.

== Bose–Einstein ==
Suppose $\varphi$ and $\chi$ are fields such that, if x and y are spacelike-separated points and i and j represent the spinor/tensor indices,

$$[\varphi_i(x),\varphi_j(y)]=[\chi_i(x),\chi_j(y)]=\{\varphi_i(x),\chi_j(y)\}=0.$$

Also suppose $\chi$ is invariant under the Z_{2} parity (nothing to do with spatial reflections!) mapping $\chi$ to $-\chi$ but leaving $\varphi$ invariant. Free field theories always satisfy this property. Then, the Z_{2} parity of the number of $\chi$ particles is well defined and is conserved in time. Let's denote this parity by the operator K_{χ} which maps $\chi$-even states to itself and $\chi$-odd states into their negative. Then, K_{χ} is involutive, Hermitian and unitary.

The fields $\varphi$ and $\chi$ above don't have the proper statistics relations for either a boson or a fermion. This means that they are bosonic with respect to themselves but fermionic with respect to each other. Their statistical properties, when viewed on their own, have exactly the same statistics as the Bose–Einstein statistics because:

Define two new fields $\varphi'$ and $\chi'$ as follows:

$$\varphi'=iK_{\chi}\varphi\,$$

and

$$\chi'=K_{\chi}\chi.\,$$

This redefinition is invertible (because K_{χ} is). The spacelike commutation relations become

$$[\varphi'_i(x),\varphi'_j(y)]=[\chi'_i(x),\chi'_j(y)]=[\varphi'_i(x),\chi'_j(y)]=0.\,$$

== Fermi–Dirac ==
Consider the example where

$$\{\phi^i(x),\phi^j(y)\}=\{\chi^i(x),\chi^j(y)\}=[\phi^i(x),\chi^j(y)]=0$$

(spacelike-separated as usual).

Assume you have a Z_{2} conserved parity operator K_{χ} acting upon χ alone.

Let

$$\phi'=iK_{\chi}\phi\,$$

and

$$\chi'=K_{\chi}\chi.\,$$

Then

$$\{\phi'^i(x),\phi'^j(y)\}=\{\chi'^i(x),\chi'^j(y)\}=\{\phi'^i(x),\chi'^j(y)\}=0.$$

== See also ==
- Jordan–Schwinger transformation
- Jordan–Wigner transformation
- Bogoliubov–Valatin transformation
- Holstein–Primakoff transformation
