= Jordan map =

In theoretical physics, the Jordan map, often also called the Jordan–Schwinger map is a map from matrices M_{ij} to bilinear expressions of quantum oscillators which expedites computation of representations of Lie algebras occurring in physics. It was introduced by Pascual Jordan in 1935 and was utilized by Julian Schwinger in 1952 to re-work out the theory of quantum angular momentum efficiently, given that map’s ease of organizing the (symmetric) representations of su(2) in Fock space.

The map utilizes several creation and annihilation operators $a^\dagger_i$ and $a^{\,}_i$ of routine use in quantum field theories and many-body problems, each pair representing a quantum harmonic oscillator. The commutation relations of creation and annihilation operators in a multiple-boson system are,

$$[a^{\,}_i, a^\dagger_j] \equiv a^{\,}_i a^\dagger_j - a^\dagger_ja^{\,}_i = \delta_{i j},$$
$$[a^\dagger_i, a^\dagger_j] = [a^{\,}_i, a^{\,}_j] = 0,$$

where $[\ \ , \ \ ]$ is the commutator and $\delta_{i j}$ is the Kronecker delta.

These operators change the eigenvalues of the number operator,

$$N = \sum_i n_i = \sum_i a^\dagger_i a^{\,}_i$$,

by one, as for multidimensional quantum harmonic oscillators.

The Jordan map from a set of matrices M_{ij} to Fock space bilinear operators M,

$${\mathbf M}  \qquad \longmapsto \qquad   M \equiv  \sum_{i,j}  a^\dagger_i  {\mathbf M}_{ij}    a_j  ~,$$

is clearly a Lie algebra isomorphism, i.e. the operators M satisfy the same commutation relations as the matrices M.

== The example of angular momentum ==
For example, the image of the Pauli matrices of SU(2) in this map,

$${\vec J} \equiv {\mathbf a}^\dagger \cdot\frac{ \vec \sigma } {2} \cdot {\mathbf a} ~,$$

for two-vector a^{†}s, and as satisfy the same commutation relations of SU(2) as well, and moreover, by reliance on the completeness relation for Pauli matrices,

$$J^2\equiv {\vec J} \cdot {\vec J} = \frac{N}{2} \left ( \frac{N}{2}+1\right ) .$$

This is the starting point of Schwinger’s treatment of the theory of quantum angular momentum, predicated on the action of these operators on Fock states built of arbitrary higher powers of such operators. For instance, acting on an (unnormalized) Fock eigenstate,

$$J^2~ a^{\dagger k}_1 a^{\dagger n}_2 |0\rangle = \frac{k+n}{2} \left ( \frac{k+n}{2}+1\right ) ~ a^{\dagger k}_1 a^{\dagger n}_2 |0\rangle ~,$$

while

$$J_z ~ a^{\dagger k}_1 a^{\dagger n}_2 |0\rangle = \frac{1}{2} \left ( k-n\right ) a^{\dagger k}_1 a^{\dagger n}_2 |0\rangle ~,$$

so that, for j = (k+n)/2, m = (k−n)/2, this is proportional to the eigenstate |j,m⟩,

$|j,m\rangle= \frac{a_1^{\dagger ~k} a_2^{\dagger ~ n} }{\sqrt{k!~n!}} |0\rangle = \frac{a_1^{\dagger ~(j+m)} a_2^{\dagger ~ (j-m)} }{\sqrt{(j+m)!~(j-m)!}} |0\rangle ~ .$

Observe $J_+ = a_1^\dagger a_2$ and $J_- = a_2^\dagger a_1$, as well as $J_z = (a_1^\dagger a_1 - a_2^\dagger a_2 )/2$.

== Fermions ==
Antisymmetric representations of Lie algebras can further be accommodated by use of the fermionic operators $b^\dagger_i$ and $b^{\,}_i$, as also suggested by Jordan. For fermions, the commutator is replaced by the anticommutator $\{\ \ , \ \ \}$,

$$\{b^{\,}_i, b^\dagger_j\} \equiv b^{\,}_i b^\dagger_j +b^\dagger_j b^{\,}_i = \delta_{i j},$$
$$\{b^\dagger_i, b^\dagger_j\} = \{b^{\,}_i, b^{\,}_j\} = 0.$$

Therefore, exchanging disjoint (i.e. $i \ne j$) operators in a product of creation of annihilation operators will reverse the sign in fermion systems, but not in boson systems. This formalism has been used by A. A. Abrikosov in the theory of the Kondo effect to represent the localized spin-1/2, and is called Abrikosov fermions in the solid-state physics literature.

== See also ==
- Borel-Weil-Bott Theorem
- Current algebra
- Angular momentum operator
- Klein transformation
- Bogoliubov transformation
- Holstein–Primakoff transformation
- Jordan–Wigner transformation
- Clebsch–Gordan coefficients for SU(3)#Symmetry group of the 3D oscillator Hamiltonian operator
