= CCR and CAR algebras =

Canonical commutation or anticommutation relations

In mathematics and physics CCR algebras (after canonical commutation relations) and CAR algebras (after canonical anticommutation relations) arise from the quantum mechanical study of bosons and fermions, respectively. They play a prominent role in quantum statistical mechanics and quantum field theory.

== CCR and CAR as *-algebras ==
Let $V$ be a real vector space equipped with a nonsingular real antisymmetric bilinear form $(\cdot,\cdot)$ (i.e. a symplectic vector space). The unital *-algebra generated by elements of $V$ subject to the relations

$$fg-gf=i(f,g) \,$$
$$f^*=f, \,$$

for any $f,~g$ in $V$ is called the canonical commutation relations (CCR) algebra. The uniqueness of the representations of this algebra when $V$ is finite dimensional is discussed in the Stone–von Neumann theorem.

If $V$ is equipped with a nonsingular real symmetric bilinear form $(\cdot,\cdot)$ instead, the unital *-algebra generated by the elements of $V$ subject to the relations

$$fg+gf=(f,g), \,$$
$$f^*=f, \,$$

for any $f,~g$ in $V$ is called the canonical anticommutation relations (CAR) algebra.

== The C*-algebra of CCR ==
There is a distinct, but closely related meaning of CCR algebra, called the CCR C*-algebra. Let $H$ be a real symplectic vector space with nonsingular symplectic form $(\cdot,\cdot)$. In the theory of operator algebras, the CCR algebra over $H$ is the unital C*-algebra generated by elements $\{W(f):~f\in H\}$ subject to

$$W(f)W(g)=e^{-i(f,g)}W(f+g), \,$$
$$W(f)^*=W(-f). \,$$

These are called the Weyl form of the canonical commutation relations and, in particular, they imply that each $W(f)$ is unitary and $W(0)=1$. It is well known that the CCR algebra is a simple (unless the symplectic form is degenerate) non-separable algebra and is unique up to isomorphism.

When $H$ is a complex Hilbert space and $(\cdot,\cdot)$ is given by the imaginary part of the inner-product, the CCR algebra is faithfully represented on the symmetric Fock space over $H$ by setting

$$W(f)\left(1,g,\frac{g^{\otimes 2}}{2!},\frac{g^{\otimes 3}}{3!},\ldots\right)= e^{-\frac{1}{2}\|f\|^2-\langle f,g\rangle }\left(1,f+g,\frac{(f+g)^{\otimes 2}}{2!}, \frac{(f+g)^{\otimes 3}}{3!}, \ldots\right),$$

for any $f,g \in H$. The field operators $B(f)$ are defined for each $f\in H$ as the generator of the one-parameter unitary group $(W(tf))_{t\in\mathbb{R}}$ on the symmetric Fock space. These are self-adjoint unbounded operators, however they formally satisfy

$$B(f)B(g)-B(g)B(f) = 2i\operatorname{Im}\langle f,g\rangle.$$

As the assignment $f\mapsto B(f)$ is real-linear, so the operators $B(f)$ define a CCR algebra over $(H,2\operatorname{Im}\langle\cdot,\cdot\rangle)$ in the sense of Section 1.

== The C*-algebra of CAR ==
Let $H$ be a Hilbert space. In the theory of operator algebras the CAR algebra is the unique C*-completion of the complex unital *-algebra generated by elements $\{b(f),b^*(f):~f\in H\}$ subject to the relations

$$b(f)b^*(g)+b^*(g)b(f)=\langle f,g\rangle, \,$$
$$b(f)b(g)+b(g)b(f)=0, \,$$
$$\lambda b^*(f)=b^*(\lambda f), \,$$
$$b(f)^*=b^*(f), \,$$

for any $f,g\in H$, $\lambda\in\mathbb{C}$. When $H$ is separable the CAR algebra is an AF algebra and in the special case $H$ is infinite dimensional it is often written as ${M_{2^\infty}(\mathbb{C})}$.

Let $F_a(H)$ be the antisymmetric Fock space over $H$ and let $P_a$ be the orthogonal projection onto antisymmetric vectors:

$$P_a: \bigoplus_{n=0}^\infty H^{\otimes n} \to F_a(H). \,$$

The CAR algebra is faithfully represented on $F_a(H)$ by setting

$$b^*(f)P_a(g_1\otimes g_2\otimes\cdots\otimes g_n)=\sqrt{n+1}P_a(f\otimes g_1\otimes g_2\otimes\cdots\otimes g_n) \,$$

for all $f,g_1,\ldots,g_n\in H$ and $n\in\mathbb{N}$. The fact that these form a C*-algebra is due to the fact that creation and annihilation operators on antisymmetric Fock space are bona-fide bounded operators. Moreover, the field operators $B(f):=b^*(f)+b(f)$ satisfy

$$B(f)B(g)+B(g)B(f)=2\mathrm{Re}\langle f,g\rangle, \,$$

giving the relationship with Section 1.

== Superalgebra generalization ==
Let $V$ be a real $\mathbb{Z}_2$-graded vector space equipped with a nonsingular antisymmetric bilinear superform $(\cdot,\cdot)$ (i.e. $(g,f)=-(-1)^{|f||g|}(f,g)$ ) such that $(f,g)$ is real if either $f$ or $g$ is an even element and imaginary if both of them are odd. The unital *-algebra generated by the elements of $V$ subject to the relations

$$fg-(-1)^{|f||g|}gf=i(f,g) \,$$
$$f^*=f,~g^*=g\,$$

for any two pure elements $f,~g$ in $V$ is the obvious superalgebra generalization which unifies CCRs with CARs: if all pure elements are even, one obtains a CCR, while if all pure elements are odd, one obtains a CAR.

In mathematics, the abstract structure of the CCR and CAR algebras, over any field, not just the complex numbers, is studied by the name of Weyl and Clifford algebras, where many significant results have accrued. One of these is that the graded generalizations of Weyl and Clifford algebras allow the basis-free formulation of the canonical commutation and anticommutation relations in terms of a symplectic and a symmetric non-degenerate bilinear form. In addition, the binary elements in this graded Weyl algebra give a basis-free version of the commutation relations of the symplectic and indefinite orthogonal Lie algebras.

== See also ==
- Bose–Einstein statistics
- Fermi–Dirac statistics
- Glossary of string theory
- Heisenberg group
- Bogoliubov transformation
- (−1)^{F}
