= Jordan–Wigner transformation =

Mathematical mapping in quantum mechanics

The Jordan–Wigner transformation is a transformation that maps spin operators onto fermionic creation and annihilation operators. It was proposed by Pascual Jordan and Eugene Wigner in 1928 for one-dimensional lattice models, but now two-dimensional analogues of the transformation have also been created. The Jordan–Wigner transformation is often used to exactly solve 1D spin-chains such as the Ising and XY models by transforming the spin operators to fermionic operators and then diagonalizing in the fermionic basis.

This transformation actually shows that the distinction between spin-1/2 particles and fermions is nonexistent. It can be applied to systems with an arbitrary dimension.

== Analogy between spins and fermions ==
In what follows we will show how to map a 1D spin chain of spin-1/2 particles to fermions.

Take spin-1/2 Pauli operators acting on a site $j$ of a 1D chain, $\sigma_{j}^{+}, \sigma_{j}^{-}, \sigma_{j}^{z}$. Taking the anticommutator of $\sigma_{j}^{+}$ and $\sigma_{j}^{-}$, we find $\{\sigma_{j}^{+},\sigma_{j}^{-}\} = I$, as would be expected from fermionic creation and annihilation operators. We might then be tempted to set

$$\sigma_{j}^{+} = (\sigma_{j}^{x}+i\sigma_{j}^{y})/2 \equiv f_{j}^{\dagger}$$
$$\sigma_{j}^{-} = (\sigma_{j}^{x}-i\sigma_{j}^{y})/2 \equiv f_{j}$$
$$\sigma_{j}^{z} = 2f_{j}^{\dagger}f_{j} - I.$$

Now, we have the correct same-site fermionic relations $\{f_{j}^{\dagger}, f_{j}\}=I$; however, on different sites, we have the relation $\{f_{j}^{\dagger},f_{k}\} = 0$, and $[\sigma_{j}^{+},\sigma_{k}^{-}] = 0$ where $j \neq k$, so spins on different sites commute unlike fermions which anti-commute. We must remedy this before we can take the analogy very seriously.

A transformation which recovers the true fermion commutation relations from spin-operators was performed in 1928 by Jordan and Wigner. This is a special example of a Klein transformation. We take a chain of fermions, and define a new set of operators

$$a_{j}^{\dagger} = e^{\left(+i\pi \sum_{k=1}^{j-1}f_{k}^{\dagger} f_{k}\right)} \cdot f_{j}^{\dagger}$$
$$a_{j} = e^{\left(-i\pi \sum_{k=1}^{j-1}f_{k}^{\dagger} f_{k}\right)} \cdot f_{j}$$
$$a_{j}^{\dagger} a_{j} = f_{j}^{\dagger} f_{j}.$$

They differ from the above only by a phase $e^{\pm i\pi \sum_{k=1}^{j-1}f_{k}^{\dagger} f_{k}}$. The phase is determined by the number of occupied fermionic modes in modes $k=1,\ldots,j-1$ of the field. The phase is equal to $+1$ if the number of occupied modes is even, and $-1$ if the number of occupied modes is odd. This phase is often expressed as

$$e^{\left(\pm i\pi \sum_{k=1}^{j-1}f_{k}^{\dagger} f_{k}\right)}=\prod_{k=1}^{j-1}e^{\pm i\pi f_{k}^{\dagger} f_{k}}=\prod_{k=1}^{j-1}{e^{\pm i\pi \frac{\sigma _{k}^{z}+I}{2}}}=\prod_{k=1}^{j-1}(-\sigma_{k}^{z}).$$

The transformed spin operators now have the appropriate fermionic canonical anti-commutation relations

$$\{a_i^\dagger, a_j\}=\delta_{i,j}, \, \{a_i^\dagger, a_j^\dagger\}=0, \, \{a_i, a_j\}=0.$$

The above anti-commutation relations can be proved by invoking the relations

$\{e^{(-i\pi f_{j}^\dagger f_{j})} , f_j\}=\{e^{(i\pi f_{j}^\dagger f_{j})} , f_j^\dagger\}=0$

The inverse transformation is given by

$$\sigma_{j}^{+} = e^{\left(-i\pi \sum_{k=1}^{j-1}a_{k}^{\dagger} a_{k}\right)} \cdot a_{j}^{\dagger}$$
$$\sigma_{j}^{-} = e^{\left(+i\pi \sum_{k=1}^{j-1}a_{k}^{\dagger} a_{k}\right)} \cdot a_{j}$$
$$\sigma_{j}^{z} = 2a_{j}^{\dagger}a_{j} - I$$

Note that the definition of the fermionic operators is nonlocal with respect to the bosonic operators because we have to deal with an entire chain of operators to the left of the site the fermionic operators are defined with respect to. This is also true the other way around. This is an example of a 't Hooft loop, which is a disorder operator instead of an order operator. This is also an example of an S-duality.

If the system has more than one dimension the transformation can still be applied. It is only necessary to label the sites in an arbitrary way by a single index.

== Quantum computing ==
The Jordan–Wigner transformation can be inverted to map a fermionic Hamiltonian into a spin Hamiltonian. A series of spins is equivalent to a chain of qubits for quantum computing. Some molecular potentials can be efficiently simulated by a quantum computer using this transformation.

== See also ==
- S-duality – Equivalence of two physical theories
- Klein transformation – Type of field redefinition
- Bogoliubov transformation – Mathematical operation in quantum optics, general relativity and other areas of physics
- Holstein–Primakoff transformation – Transformation in quantum mechanics
- Jordan–Schwinger transformation
