= Moyal =

Moyal may refer to:

== People ==
- Ann Moyal (1926–2019), Australian historian
- Damien Moyal (born 1976), American vocalist, musician and designer
- Diana López Moyal, Cuban flutist
- Eliyahu Moyal (1920–1991), Israeli politician
- Esther Moyal (1874–1948), Beirut-born Jewish journalist
- Harel Moyal (born 1981), Israeli pop singer-songwriter and stage actor
- José Enrique Moyal (1910–1998), mathematical physicist
- Kobi Moyal (born 1987), Israeli footballer
- Saul Moyal, Egyptian fencer
- Shimon Moyal (1866–1915), Zionist activist and physician
- Yohanan Moyal (born 1965), Israeli Olympic gymnast

== Other ==
- Moyal bracket, in physics, the suitably normalized antisymmetrization of the phase-space star product
- Moyal product, in mathematics, perhaps the best-known example of a phase-space star product
