= Canonical commutation relation =

Relation satisfied by conjugate variables in quantum mechanics

In quantum mechanics, the canonical commutation relation is the fundamental relation between canonical conjugate quantities (quantities which are related by definition such that one is the Fourier transform of another). For example,
$$[\hat x,\hat p_x] = i\hbar \mathbb{I}$$

between the position operator x and momentum operator p_{x} in the x direction of a point particle in one dimension, where [x , p_{x}] = x p_{x} − p_{x} x is the commutator of x and p_{x} , i is the imaginary unit, and ℏ is the reduced Planck constant (h/2π), and $\mathbb{I}$ is the unit operator. In finite dimensions, position and momentum are vectors of operators and their commutation relation between different components of position and momentum can be expressed as
$$[\hat x_i,\hat p_j] = i\hbar \delta_{ij},$$
where $\delta_{ij}$ is the Kronecker delta.

This relation is attributed to Werner Heisenberg, Max Born and Pascual Jordan (1925), who called it a "quantum condition" serving as a postulate of the theory; it was noted by E. Kennard (1927) to imply the Heisenberg uncertainty principle. The Stone–von Neumann theorem gives a uniqueness result for operators satisfying (an exponentiated form of) the canonical commutation relation.

== Relation to classical mechanics ==
By contrast, in classical physics, all observables commute and the commutator would be zero. However, an analogous relation exists, which is obtained by replacing the commutator with the Poisson bracket multiplied by $i\hbar$,
$$\{x,p\} = 1 \, .$$

This observation led Dirac to propose that the quantum counterparts $\hat{f}$, $\hat{g}$ of classical observables f, g satisfy
$$[\hat f,\hat g]= i\hbar\widehat{\{f,g\}} \, .$$

In 1946, Hip Groenewold demonstrated that a general systematic correspondence between quantum commutators and Poisson brackets could not hold consistently.

However, he further appreciated that such a systematic correspondence does, in fact, exist between the quantum commutator and a deformation of the Poisson bracket, today called the Moyal bracket, and, in general, quantum operators and classical observables and distributions in phase space. He thus finally elucidated the consistent correspondence mechanism, the Wigner–Weyl transform, that underlies an alternate equivalent mathematical representation of quantum mechanics known as deformation quantization.

=== Derivation from Hamiltonian mechanics ===
According to the correspondence principle, in certain limits the quantum equations of states must approach Hamilton's equations of motion. The latter state the following relation between the generalized coordinate q (e.g. position) and the generalized momentum p:
$$\begin{cases}
\dot{q} =  \frac{\partial H}{\partial p} = \{q, H\}; \\
\dot{p} = -\frac{\partial H}{\partial q} = \{p, H\}.
\end{cases}$$

In quantum mechanics the Hamiltonian $\hat{H}$, (generalized) coordinate $\hat{Q}$ and (generalized) momentum $\hat{P}$ are all linear operators.

The time derivative of a quantum state is represented by the operator $-i\hat{H}/\hbar$ (by the Schrödinger equation). Equivalently, since in the Schrödinger picture the operators are not explicitly time-dependent, the operators can be seen to be evolving in time (for a contrary perspective where the operators are time dependent, see Heisenberg picture) according to their commutation relation with the Hamiltonian:
$$\frac {d\hat{Q}}{dt} = \frac {i}{\hbar} [\hat{H},\hat{Q}]$$
$$\frac {d\hat{P}}{dt} = \frac {i}{\hbar} [\hat{H},\hat{P}] \,\, .$$

In order for that to reconcile in the classical limit with Hamilton's equations of motion, $[\hat{H},\hat{Q}]$ must depend entirely on the appearance of $\hat{P}$ in the Hamiltonian and $[\hat{H},\hat{P}]$ must depend entirely on the appearance of $\hat{Q}$ in the Hamiltonian. Further, since the Hamiltonian operator depends on the (generalized) coordinate and momentum operators, it can be viewed as a functional, and we may write (using functional derivatives):
$$[\hat{H},\hat{Q}] = \frac {\delta \hat{H}}{\delta \hat{P}} \cdot [\hat{P},\hat{Q}]$$
$$[\hat{H},\hat{P}] = \frac {\delta \hat{H}}{\delta \hat{Q}} \cdot [\hat{Q},\hat{P}] \, .$$

In order to obtain the classical limit we must then have
$$[\hat{Q},\hat{P}] = i \hbar ~ I.$$

== Weyl relations ==
The group $H_3(\mathbb{R})$ generated by exponentiation of the 3-dimensional Lie algebra determined by the commutation relation $[\hat{x},\hat{p}]=i\hbar$ is called the Heisenberg group. This group can be realized as the group of $3\times 3$ upper triangular matrices with ones on the diagonal.

According to the standard mathematical formulation of quantum mechanics, quantum observables such as $\hat{x}$ and $\hat{p}$ should be represented as self-adjoint operators on some Hilbert space. It is relatively easy to see that two operators satisfying the above canonical commutation relations cannot both be bounded. Certainly, if $\hat{x}$ and $\hat{p}$ were trace class operators, the relation $\operatorname{Tr}(AB)=\operatorname{Tr}(BA)$ gives a nonzero number on the right and zero on the left.

Alternately, if $\hat{x}$ and $\hat{p}$ were bounded operators, note that $[\hat{x}^n,\hat{p}]=i\hbar n \hat{x}^{n-1}$, hence the operator norms would satisfy
$$2 \left\|\hat{p}\right\| \left\|\hat{x}^{n-1}\right\| \left\|\hat{x}\right\|  \geq n \hbar \left\|\hat{x}^{n-1}\right\|,$$
so that, for any n,
$$2 \left\|\hat{p}\right\| \left\|\hat{x}\right\| \geq n \hbar$$
However, n can be arbitrarily large, so at least one operator cannot be bounded, and the dimension of the underlying Hilbert space cannot be finite. If the operators satisfy the Weyl relations (an exponentiated version of the canonical commutation relations, described below) then as a consequence of the Stone–von Neumann theorem, both operators must be unbounded.

Still, these canonical commutation relations can be rendered somewhat "tamer" by writing them in terms of the (bounded) unitary operators $\exp(it\hat{x})$ and $\exp(is\hat{p})$. The resulting braiding relations for these operators are the so-called Weyl relations
$$\exp(it\hat{x})\exp(is\hat{p})=\exp(-ist\hbar)\exp(is\hat{p})\exp(it\hat{x}).$$
These relations may be thought of as an exponentiated version of the canonical commutation relations; they reflect that translations in position and translations in momentum do not commute. One can easily reformulate the Weyl relations in terms of the representations of the Heisenberg group.

The uniqueness of the canonical commutation relations—in the form of the Weyl relations—is then guaranteed by the Stone–von Neumann theorem.

For technical reasons, the Weyl relations are not strictly equivalent to the canonical commutation relation $[\hat{x},\hat{p}]=i\hbar$. If $\hat{x}$ and $\hat{p}$ were bounded operators, then a special case of the Baker–Campbell–Hausdorff formula would allow one to "exponentiate" the canonical commutation relations to the Weyl relations. Since, as we have noted, any operators satisfying the canonical commutation relations must be unbounded, the Baker–Campbell–Hausdorff formula does not apply without additional domain assumptions. Indeed, counterexamples exist satisfying the canonical commutation relations but not the Weyl relations. (These same operators give a counterexample to the naive form of the uncertainty principle.) These technical issues are the reason that the Stone–von Neumann theorem is formulated in terms of the Weyl relations.

A discrete version of the Weyl relations, in which the parameters s and t range over $\mathbb{Z}/n$, can be realized on a finite-dimensional Hilbert space by means of the clock and shift matrices.

== Generalizations ==
It can be shown that
$$[F(\vec{x}),p_i] = i\hbar\frac{\partial F(\vec{x})}{\partial x_i}; \qquad [x_i, F(\vec{p})] = i\hbar\frac{\partial F(\vec{p})}{\partial p_i}.$$

Using $C_{n+1}^{k} = C_{n}^{k} + C_{n}^{k-1}$, it can be shown that by mathematical induction
$$\left[\hat{x}^n,\hat{p}^m\right] = \sum_{k=1}^{\min\left(m,n\right)}{ \frac{-\left(-i \hbar\right)^k n!m!}{k!\left(n-k\right)!\left(m-k\right)!} \hat{x}^{n-k} \hat{p}^{m-k}} = \sum_{k=1}^{\min\left(m,n\right)}{ \frac{\left(i \hbar\right)^k n!m!}{k!\left(n-k\right)!\left(m-k\right)!} \hat{p}^{m-k}\hat{x}^{n-k}} ,$$
generally known as McCoy's formula.

In addition, the simple formula
$$[x,p] = i\hbar \, \mathbb{I} ~,$$
valid for the quantization of the simplest classical system, can be generalized to the case of an arbitrary Lagrangian ${\mathcal L}$. We identify canonical coordinates (such as x in the example above, or a field Φ(x) in the case of quantum field theory) and canonical momenta π_{x} (in the example above it is p, or more generally, some functions involving the derivatives of the canonical coordinates with respect to time):
$$\pi_i \ \stackrel{\mathrm{def}}{=}\ \frac{\partial {\mathcal L}}{\partial(\partial x_i / \partial t)}.$$

This definition of the canonical momentum ensures that one of the Euler–Lagrange equations has the form
$$\frac{\partial}{\partial t} \pi_i = \frac{\partial {\mathcal L}}{\partial x_i}.$$

The canonical commutation relations then amount to
$$[x_i,\pi_j] = i\hbar\delta_{ij} \,$$
where δ_{ij} is the Kronecker delta.

== Gauge invariance ==
Canonical quantization is applied, by definition, on canonical coordinates. However, in the presence of an electromagnetic field, the canonical momentum p is not gauge invariant. The correct gauge-invariant momentum (or "kinetic momentum") is

$p_\text{kin} = p - qA \,\!$ (SI units) $p_\text{kin} = p - \frac{qA}{c} \,\!$ (cgs units),

where q is the particle's electric charge, A is the vector potential, and c is the speed of light. Although the quantity p_{kin} is the "physical momentum", in that it is the quantity to be identified with momentum in laboratory experiments, it does not satisfy the canonical commutation relations; only the canonical momentum does that. This can be seen as follows.

The non-relativistic Hamiltonian for a quantized charged particle of mass m in a classical electromagnetic field is (in cgs units)
$$H=\frac{1}{2m} \left(p-\frac{qA}{c}\right)^2 +q\phi$$
where A is the three-vector potential and φ is the scalar potential. This form of the Hamiltonian, as well as the Schrödinger equation Hψ = iħ∂ψ/∂t, the Maxwell equations and the Lorentz force law are invariant under the gauge transformation
$$A\to A' = A+\nabla \Lambda$$
$$\phi\to \phi' = \phi-\frac{1}{c} \frac{\partial \Lambda}{\partial t}$$
$$\psi \to \psi' = U\psi$$
$$H\to H' = U H U^\dagger,$$
where
$$U=\exp \left( \frac{iq\Lambda}{\hbar c}\right)$$
and Λ = Λ(x,t) is the gauge function.

The angular momentum operator is
$$L=r \times p \,\!$$
and obeys the canonical quantization relations
$$[L_i, L_j]= i\hbar {\epsilon_{ijk}} L_k$$
defining the Lie algebra for so(3), where $\epsilon_{ijk}$ is the Levi-Civita symbol. Under gauge transformations, the angular momentum transforms as
$$\langle \psi \vert L \vert \psi \rangle \to
\langle \psi^\prime \vert L^\prime \vert \psi^\prime \rangle =
\langle \psi \vert L \vert \psi \rangle +
\frac {q}{\hbar c} \langle \psi \vert r \times \nabla \Lambda \vert \psi \rangle \, .$$

The gauge-invariant angular momentum (or "kinetic angular momentum") is given by
$$K=r \times \left(p-\frac{qA}{c}\right),$$
which has the commutation relations
$$[K_i,K_j]=i\hbar {\epsilon_{ij}}^{\,k}
\left(K_k+\frac{q\hbar}{c} x_k
\left(x \cdot B\right)\right)$$
where
$$B=\nabla \times A$$
is the magnetic field. The inequivalence of these two formulations shows up in the Zeeman effect and the Aharonov–Bohm effect.

== Uncertainty relation and commutators ==
All such nontrivial commutation relations for pairs of operators lead to corresponding uncertainty relations, involving positive semi-definite expectation contributions by their respective commutators and anticommutators. In general, for two Hermitian operators A and B, consider expectation values in a system in the state ψ, the variances around the corresponding expectation values being (ΔA)^{2} ≡ ⟨(A − ⟨A⟩)^{2}⟩, etc.

Then
$$\Delta A \, \Delta B \geq \frac{1}{2} \sqrt{ \left|\left\langle\left[{A},{B}\right]\right\rangle \right|^2 + \left|\left\langle\left\{ A-\langle A\rangle ,B-\langle B\rangle \right\} \right\rangle \right|^2} ,$$
where [A, B] ≡ A B − B A is the commutator of A and B, and {A, B} ≡ A B + B A is the anticommutator.

This follows through use of the Cauchy–Schwarz inequality, since |⟨A^{2}⟩| |⟨B^{2}⟩| ≥ |⟨A B⟩|^{2}, and A B = ([A, B] + {A, B})/2 ; and similarly for the shifted operators A − ⟨A⟩ and B − ⟨B⟩. (Cf. uncertainty principle derivations.)

Substituting for A and B (and taking care with the analysis) yield Heisenberg's familiar uncertainty relation for x and p, as usual.

== Uncertainty relation for angular momentum operators ==
For the angular momentum operators L_{x} = y p_{z} − z p_{y}, etc., one has that
$$[{L_x}, {L_y}] = i \hbar \epsilon_{xyz} {L_z},$$
where $\epsilon_{xyz}$ is the Levi-Civita symbol and simply reverses the sign of the answer under pairwise interchange of the indices. An analogous relation holds for the spin operators.

Here, for L_{x} and L_{y} , in angular momentum multiplets ψ = |ℓ,m⟩, one has, for the transverse components of the Casimir invariant L_{x}^{2} + L_{y}^{2}+ L_{z}^{2}, the z-symmetric relations

⟨L_{x}^{2}⟩ = ⟨L_{y}^{2}⟩ = (ℓ (ℓ + 1) − m^{2}) ℏ^{2}/2 ,

as well as ⟨L_{x}⟩ = ⟨L_{y}⟩ = 0 .

Consequently, the above inequality applied to this commutation relation specifies
$$\Delta L_x \, \Delta L_y \geq \frac{1}{2} \sqrt{\hbar^2|\langle L_z \rangle|^2}~,$$
hence
$$\sqrt {|\langle L_x^2\rangle \langle L_y^2\rangle |} \geq \frac{\hbar^2}{2} \vert m\vert$$
and therefore
$$\ell(\ell+1)-m^2\geq |m| ~,$$
so, then, it yields useful constraints such as a lower bound on the Casimir invariant: ℓ (ℓ + 1) ≥ |m| (|m| + 1), and hence ℓ ≥ |m|, among others.

== See also ==
- Canonical quantization
- CCR and CAR algebras
- Conformastatic spacetimes
- Lie derivative
- Moyal bracket
- Stone–von Neumann theorem
