= Wigner quasiprobability distribution =

Wigner distribution function in physics as opposed to in signal processing

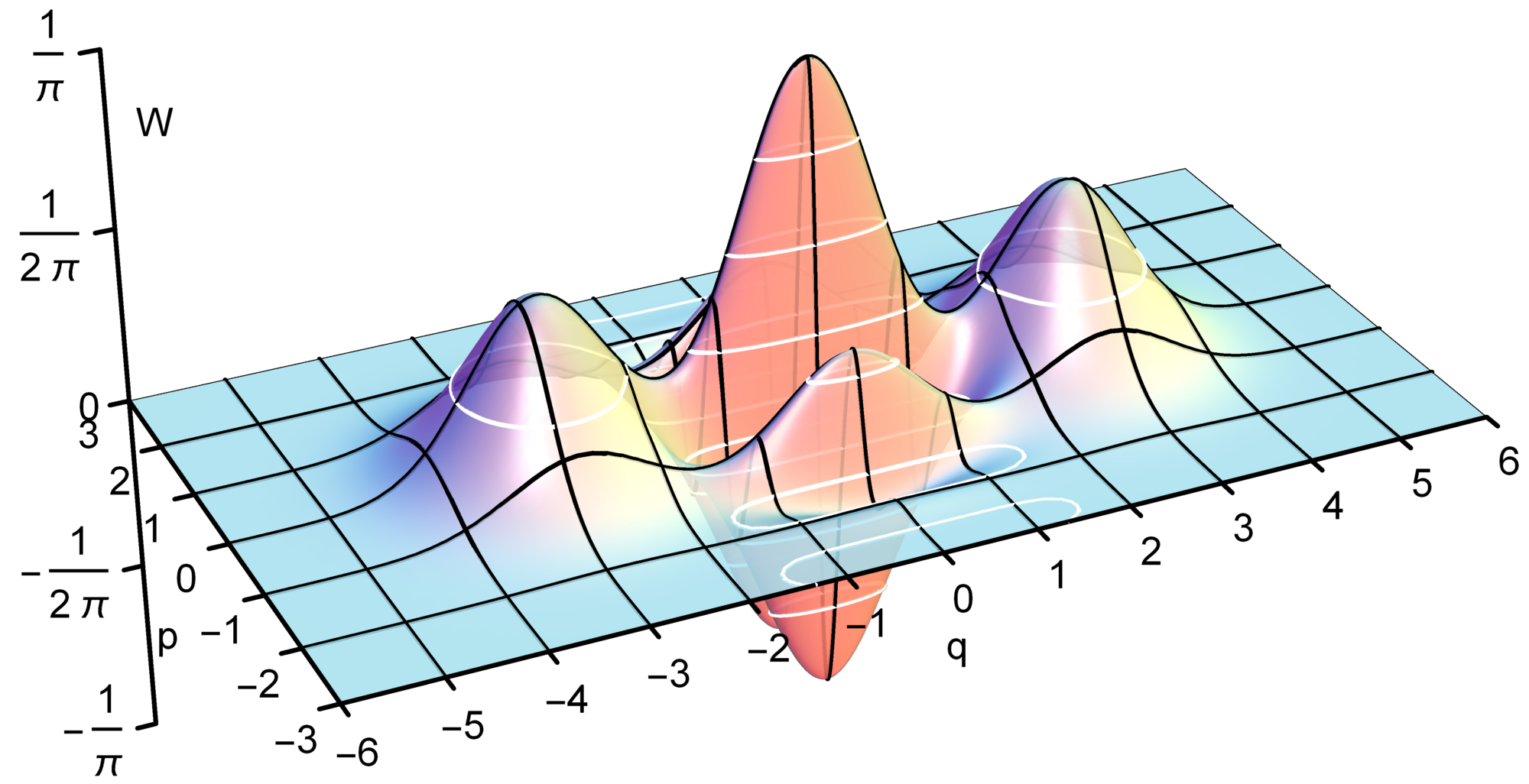
Wigner function of a so-called cat state

The Wigner quasiprobability distribution, also called the Wigner function or the Wigner–Ville distribution, after Eugene Wigner and Jean-André Ville, is a quasiprobability distribution, similar to the Margenau-Hill quasiprobability distribution and the Kirkwood–Dirac quasiprobability distribution. It was introduced by Eugene Wigner in 1932 to study quantum corrections to classical statistical mechanics. The goal was to link the wavefunction that appears in the Schrödinger equation to a probability distribution in phase space.

It is a generating function for all spatial autocorrelation functions of a given quantum-mechanical wavefunction ψ(x). Thus, it maps on the quantum density matrix in the map between real phase-space functions and Hermitian operators introduced by Hermann Weyl in 1927, in a context related to representation theory in mathematics (see Weyl quantization). In effect, it is the Wigner–Weyl transform of the density matrix, so the realization of that operator in phase space.

It has applications in statistical mechanics, quantum chemistry, quantum optics, and classical optics. Via the Wigner distribution function in signal processing, it has further applications in diverse fields such as electrical engineering, seismology, time–frequency analysis for music signals, spectrograms in biology and speech processing, and engine design.

== Relation to classical mechanics ==
A classical particle has a definite position and momentum, and hence it is represented by a point in phase space. Given a collection (ensemble) of particles, the probability of finding a particle at a certain position in phase space is specified by a probability distribution, the Liouville density. This strict interpretation fails for a quantum particle, due to the uncertainty principle. Instead, the above quasiprobability Wigner distribution plays an analogous role, but does not satisfy all the properties of a conventional probability distribution; and, conversely, satisfies boundedness properties unavailable to classical distributions.

For instance, the Wigner distribution can and normally does take on negative values for states which have no classical model—and is a convenient indicator of quantum-mechanical interference. (See below for a characterization of pure states whose Wigner functions are non-negative.) Smoothing the Wigner distribution through a filter of size larger than ħ (e.g., convolving with a phase-space Gaussian, a Weierstrass transform, to yield the Husimi representation, below), results in a positive-semidefinite function, i.e., it may be thought to have been coarsened to a semi-classical one. (Note: Specifically, since this convolution is invertible, in fact, no information has been sacrificed, and the full quantum entropy has not increased yet. However, if this resulting Husimi distribution is then used as a plain measure in a phase-space integral evaluation of expectation values without the requisite star product of the Husimi representation, then, at that stage, quantum information has been forfeited and the distribution is a semi-classical one, effectively. That is, depending on its usage in evaluating expectation values, the very same distribution may serve as a quantum or a classical distribution function.)

Regions of such negative value are provable (by convolving them with a small Gaussian) to be "small": they cannot extend to compact regions larger than a few ħ, and hence disappear in the classical limit. They are shielded by the uncertainty principle, which does not allow precise location within phase-space regions smaller than ħ, and thus renders such "negative probabilities" less paradoxical.

== Definition and meaning ==
The Wigner distribution W(x,p) of a pure state is defined as

$W(x, p)~\stackrel{\text{def}}{=}~\frac{1}{\pi\hbar} \int_{-\infty}^\infty \psi^*(x + y) \psi(x - y) e^{2ipy/\hbar}\,dy,$

where ψ is the wavefunction, and x and p are position and momentum, but could be any conjugate variable pair (e.g. real and imaginary parts of the electric field or frequency and time of a signal). Note that it may have support in x even in regions where ψ has no support in x ("beats").

It is symmetric in x and p:
$$W(x, p) = \frac{1}{\pi\hbar} \int_{-\infty}^\infty \varphi^*(p + q) \varphi(p - q) e^{-2ixq/\hbar} \,dq,$$
where $\varphi$ is the normalized momentum-space wave function, proportional to the Fourier transform of ψ.

In 3D,
$$W(\mathbf{r}, \mathbf{p}) = \frac{1}{(2\pi)^3} \int \psi^*{\!\left(\mathbf{r} + \tfrac{\hbar}{2}\mathbf{s}\right)} \psi{\left(\mathbf{r} - \tfrac{\hbar}{2} \mathbf{s}\right)} e^{i\mathbf{p} \cdot \mathbf{s}} \,d^3 s.$$

In the general case, which includes mixed states, it is the Wigner transform of the density matrix:
$$W(x, p) = \frac{1}{\pi\hbar} \int_{-\infty}^\infty \langle x - y| \hat{\rho} |x + y \rangle e^{2ipy/\hbar} \,dy,$$
where ⟨x|ψ⟩ = ψ(x). This Wigner transformation (or map) is the inverse of the Weyl transform, which maps phase-space functions to Hilbert-space operators, in Weyl quantization. Thus, the Wigner function is the cornerstone of quantum mechanics in phase space.

In second quantization the phase-space operators are $x=(a+a^\dagger)/\sqrt{2}$ and $p=-i(a-a^\dagger)/\sqrt{2}$ where the Wigner function is
$$W(x,p) = \frac{1}{\pi\hbar} \mathrm{Tr}[\rho D(\alpha) \Pi D^\dagger(\alpha)]$$
for parity operator $\Pi=e^{i\pi a^\dagger a}$ and displacement operator $D(\alpha)=e^{\alpha a^\dagger - \alpha^* a}$ with $\alpha=(x+ip)/\sqrt{2}$.

In 1949, José Enrique Moyal elucidated how the Wigner function provides the integration measure (analogous to a probability density function) in phase space, to yield expectation values from phase-space c-number functions g(x, p) uniquely associated to suitably ordered operators Ĝ through Weyl's transform (see Wigner–Weyl transform and property 7 below), in a manner evocative of classical probability theory.

Specifically, an operator's Ĝ expectation value is a "phase-space average" of the Wigner transform of that operator:
$$\langle \hat{G} \rangle = \int dx\,dp\, W(x, p) g(x, p).$$

== Mathematical properties ==
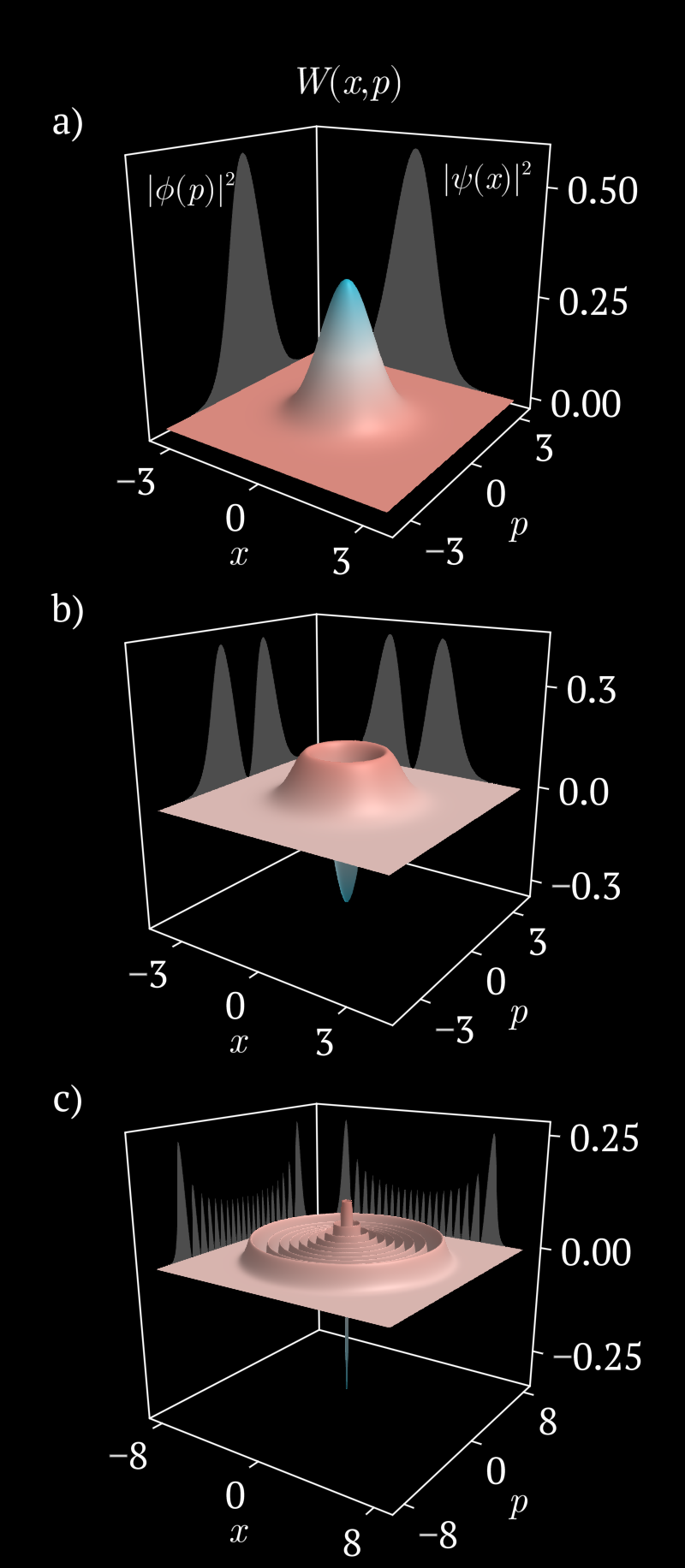
Wigner function for number states a) n = 0, b) n = 1, and c) n = 19. Marginal distributions for x and p are recovered by integrating over p and x respectively.

1. W(x, p) is a real-valued function.
2. The x and p probability distributions are given by the marginals:
  $$\int_{-\infty}^\infty dp\, W(x, p) = \langle x|\hat{\rho}|x \rangle.$$
  $$\int_{-\infty}^\infty dx\, W(x, p) = \langle p|\hat{\rho}|p \rangle.$$
  If the system can be described by a pure state, one gets $\int_{-\infty}^\infty dp\, W(x, p) = |\psi(x)|^2$ and $\int_{-\infty}^{\infty} dx\, W(x, p) = |\varphi(p)|^2.$
  $$\int_{-\infty}^\infty dx \int_{-\infty}^\infty dp\, W(x, p) = \operatorname{Tr}(\hat{\rho}).$$
  Typically the trace of the density matrix $\hat{\rho}$ is equal to 1.
3. W(x, p) has the following reflection symmetries:
  - Time symmetry: $\psi(x) \to \psi(x)^* \Rightarrow W(x, p) \to W(x, -p).$
  - Space symmetry: $\psi(x) \to \psi(-x) \Rightarrow W(x, p) \to W(-x, -p).$
4. W(x, p) is Galilei-covariant:
  $$\psi(x) \to \psi(x + y) \Rightarrow W(x, p) \to W(x + y, p).$$
  It is not Lorentz-covariant.
5. The equation of motion for each point in the phase space is classical in the absence of forces:
  $$\frac{\partial W(x, p)}{\partial t} = \frac{-p}{m} \frac{\partial W(x, p)}{\partial x}.$$
  In fact, it is classical even in the presence of harmonic forces.
6. State overlap is calculated as
  $$|\langle \psi|\theta \rangle|^2 = 2\pi\hbar \int_{-\infty}^\infty dx \int_{-\infty}^\infty dp\, W_\psi(x, p) W_\theta(x, p).$$
7. Operator expectation values (averages) are calculated as phase-space averages of the respective Wigner transforms:
  $$g(x, p) \equiv \int_{-\infty}^\infty dy\, \left\langle x - \frac{y}{2} \right| \hat{G} \left| x + \frac{y}{2} \right\rangle e^{ipy/\hbar},$$
  $$\langle \psi|\hat{G}|\psi\rangle = \operatorname{Tr}(\hat{\rho} \hat{G}) = \int_{-\infty}^\infty dx \int_{-\infty}^\infty dp\, W(x, p) g(x, p).$$
8. For W(x, p) to represent physical (positive) density matrices, it must satisfy
  $$\int_{-\infty}^\infty dx\, \int_{-\infty}^\infty dp\, W(x, p) W_\theta(x, p) \ge 0$$
  for all pure states |θ⟩.
9. By virtue of the Cauchy–Schwarz inequality, for a pure state, it is constrained to be bounded:
  $$-\frac 2 h \leq W(x, p) \leq \frac 2 h.$$
  This bound disappears in the classical limit, ħ → 0. In this limit, W(x, p) reduces to the probability density in coordinate space x, usually highly localized, multiplied by δ-functions in momentum: the classical limit is "spiky". Thus, this quantum-mechanical bound precludes a Wigner function which is a perfectly localized δ-function in phase space, as a reflection of the uncertainty principle.
10. The Wigner transformation is simply the Fourier transform of the antidiagonals of the density matrix, when that matrix is expressed in a position basis.

== Examples ==
Let $|m\rangle \equiv \frac{a^{\dagger m}}{\sqrt{m!}} |0\rangle$ be the $m$-th Fock state of a quantum harmonic oscillator. Groenewold (1946) discovered its associated Wigner function, in dimensionless variables:
$$W_{|m\rangle}(x, p) = \frac{(-1)^m}{\pi} e^{-(x^2 + p^2)} L_m\big(2(p^2 + x^2)\big),$$
where $L_m(x)$ denotes the $m$-th Laguerre polynomial.

This may follow from the expression for the static eigenstate wavefunctions,
$$u_m(x) = \pi^{-1/4} H_m(x) e^{-x^2/2},$$
where $H_m$ is the $m$-th Hermite polynomial. From the above definition of the Wigner function, upon a change of integration variables,
$$W_{|m\rangle}(x, p) = \frac{(-1)^m}{\pi^{3/2} 2^m m!} e^{-x^2 - p^2} \int_{-\infty}^\infty d\zeta\, e^{-\zeta^2} H_m(\zeta - ip + x) H_m(\zeta - ip - x).$$
The expression then follows from the integral relation between Hermite and Laguerre polynomials.

== Evolution equation ==
The Wigner transformation is a general invertible transformation of an operator Ĝ on a Hilbert space to a function g(x, p) on phase space and is given by
$$g(x, p) = \int_{-\infty}^\infty ds\, e^{ips/\hbar} \left\langle x - \tfrac s2\right| \hat G \left|x + \tfrac s2\right\rangle.$$

Hermitian operators map to real functions. The inverse of this transformation, from phase space to Hilbert space, is called the Weyl transformation:
$$\langle x | \hat G | y \rangle = \int_{-\infty}^\infty \frac{dp}{h} e^{ip(x - y)/\hbar} g{\left(\frac{x + y}{2}, p\right)}$$
(not to be confused with the distinct Weyl transformation in differential geometry).

The Wigner function W(x, p) discussed here is thus seen to be the Wigner transform of the density matrix operator $\hat{\rho}$. Thus the trace of an operator with the density matrix Wigner-transforms to the equivalent phase-space integral overlap of g(x, p) with the Wigner function.

The Wigner transform of the von Neumann evolution equation of the density matrix in the Schrödinger picture is Moyal's evolution equation for the Wigner function:

$\frac{\partial W(x, p, t)}{\partial t} = - \{\{W(x, p, t), H(x, p)\}\},$

where H(x, p) is the Hamiltonian, and {{⋅, ⋅}} is the Moyal bracket. In the classical limit, ħ → 0, the Moyal bracket reduces to the Poisson bracket, while this evolution equation reduces to the Liouville equation of classical statistical mechanics.

Formally, the classical Liouville equation can be solved in terms of the phase-space particle trajectories which are solutions of the classical Hamilton equations. This technique of solving partial differential equations is known as the method of characteristics. This method transfers to quantum systems, where the characteristics' "trajectories" now determine the evolution of Wigner functions. The solution of the Moyal evolution equation for the Wigner function is represented formally as
$$W(x, p, t) = W\big(\star\big(x_{-t}(x, p), p_{-t}(x, p)\big), 0\big),$$
where $x_t(x, p)$ and $p_t(x, p)$ are the characteristic trajectories subject to the quantum Hamilton equations with initial conditions $x_{t=0}(x, p) = x$ and $p_{t=0}(x, p) = p$, and where $\star$-product composition is understood for all argument functions.

Since $\star$-composition of functions is thoroughly nonlocal (the "quantum probability fluid" diffuses, as observed by Moyal), vestiges of local trajectories in quantum systems are barely discernible in the evolution of the Wigner distribution function. (Note: Quantum characteristics should not be confused with trajectories of the Feynman path integral, or trajectories of the de Broglie–Bohm theory. This three-fold ambiguity allows better understanding of the position of Niels Bohr, who vigorously but counterproductively opposed the notion of trajectory in the atomic physics. At the 1948 Pocono Conference, e.g., he said to Richard Feynman: "... one could not talk about the trajectory of an electron in the atom, because it was something not observable". ("The Beat of a Different Drum: The Life and Science of Richard Feynman", by Jagdish Mehra (Oxford, 1994, pp. 245–248)). Arguments of this kind were widely used in the past by Ernst Mach in his criticism of an atomic theory of physics and later, in the 1960s, by Geoffrey Chew, Tullio Regge and others to motivate replacing the local quantum field theory by the S-matrix theory. Today, statistical physics entirely based on atomistic concepts is included in standard courses, the S-matrix theory went out of fashion, while the Feynman path-integral method has been recognized as the most efficient method in gauge theories.) In the integral representation of $\star$-products, successive operations by them have been adapted to a phase-space path integral, to solve the evolution equation for the Wigner function (see also). This non-local feature of Moyal time evolution is illustrated in the gallery below, for Hamiltonians more complex than the harmonic oscillator. In the classical limit, the trajectory nature of the time evolution of Wigner functions becomes more and more distinct. At ħ = 0, the characteristics' trajectories reduce to the classical trajectories of particles in phase space.

Examples of time evolution
Pure state in a Morse potential. The green dashed lines represent level set of the Hamiltonian.

Pure state in a quartic potential. The solid lines represent the level set of the Hamiltonian.

Tunnelling of a wave packet through a potential barrier. The solid lines represent the level set of the Hamiltonian.

Long-time evolution of a mixed state ρ in an anharmonic potential well. Marginals are plotted on the right (p) and top (x).

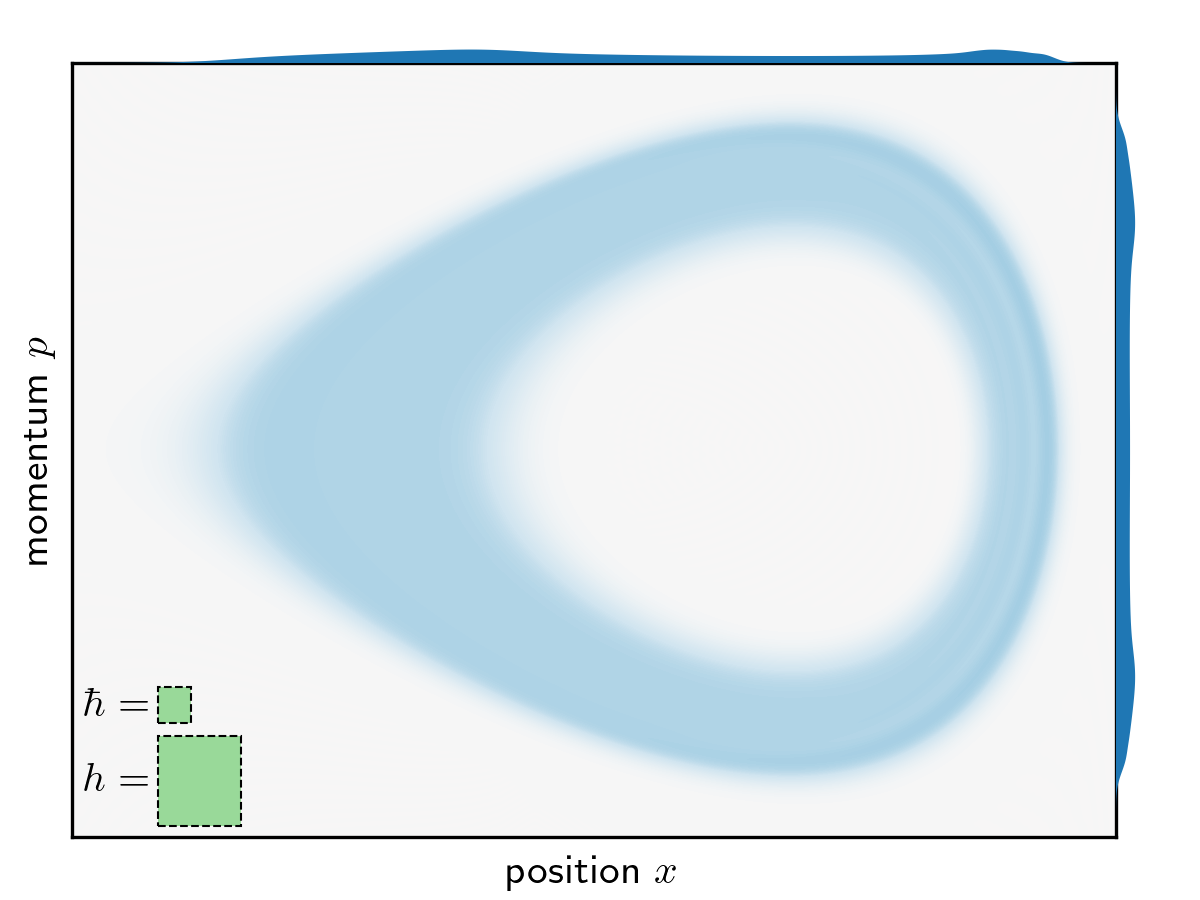
An equilibrium mixed state ρ (evolves to itself), in the same anharmonic potential.

=== Harmonic-oscillator time evolution ===
In the special case of the quantum harmonic oscillator, however, the evolution is simple and appears identical to the classical motion: a rigid rotation in phase space with a frequency given by the oscillator frequency. This is illustrated in the gallery below. This same time evolution occurs with quantum states of light modes, which are harmonic oscillators.

Examples of Wigner-function time evolutions in a quantum harmonic oscillator
Wigner quasiprobability distribution of a coherent state.

A cat state; the marginals are plotted on the right (p) and underneath (x).

Cat states with 2, 3, 4 cats. The separation between cats range from 0.5, 1, 2, 4, showing increasingly sharp inference.

A very big cat state, with 10 cats separated at $\alpha = 10$.
Fock states
Superpositioned Fock states, for $(n, m) = (1, 2)$.

$0 \leq n \leq m \leq 2$.

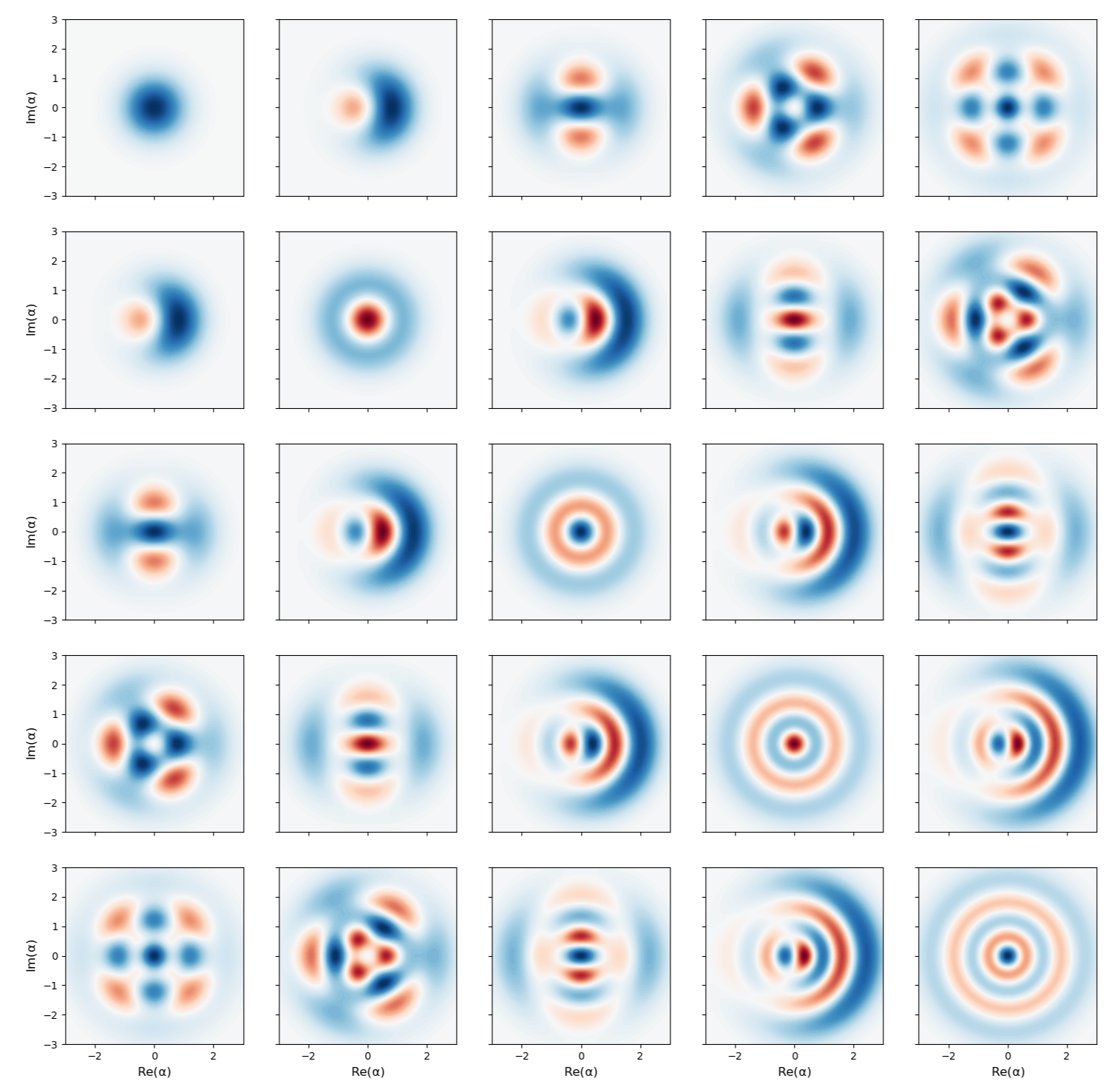
$0 \leq n \leq m \leq 4$.

Squeezed states
Wigner quasiprobability distribution of squeezed states, for varying amount of phase shift and displacement. When the phase shift is zero (leftmost column), the peak-to-peak amplitude of $x$ oscillation is less uncertain, but the phase (the time at which $x$ crosses the midpoint) is more uncertain. The opposite is true when the phase shift is half a cycle (rightmost column).

Varying purity, from totally pure to totally mixed.

== Classical limit ==
The Wigner function allows one to study the classical limit, offering a comparison of the classical and quantum dynamics in phase space.

It has been suggested that the Wigner function approach can be viewed as a quantum analogy to the operatorial formulation of classical mechanics introduced in 1932 by Bernard Koopman and John von Neumann: the time evolution of the Wigner function approaches, in the limit ħ → 0, the time evolution of the Koopman–von Neumann wavefunction of a classical particle.

Moments of the Wigner function generate symmetrized operator averages, in contrast to the normal order and antinormal order generated by the Glauber–Sudarshan P representation and Husimi Q representation respectively. The Wigner representation is thus very well suited for making semi-classical approximations in quantum optics and field theory of Bose-Einstein condensates where high mode occupation approaches a semiclassical limit.

== Positivity of the function ==
As already noted, the Wigner function of quantum state typically takes some negative values. Indeed, for a pure state in one variable, if $W(x, p) \ge 0$ for all $x$ and $p$, then the wave function must have the form
$$\psi(x) = e^{-ax^2+bx+c}$$
for some complex numbers $a, b, c$ with $\operatorname{Re}(a) > 0$ (Hudson's theorem). Note that $a$ is allowed to be complex. In other words, it is a one-dimensional gaussian wave packet. Thus, pure states with non-negative Wigner functions are not necessarily minimum-uncertainty states in the sense of the Heisenberg uncertainty formula; rather, they give equality in the Schrödinger uncertainty formula, which includes an anticommutator term in addition to the commutator term. (With careful definition of the respective variances, all pure-state Wigner functions lead to Heisenberg's inequality all the same.)

In higher dimensions, the characterization of pure states with non-negative Wigner functions is similar; the wave function must have the form
$$\psi(x) = e^{-(x,Ax)+b\cdot x+c},$$
where $A$ is a symmetric complex matrix whose real part is positive-definite, $b$ is a complex vector, and c is a complex number. The Wigner function of any such state is a Gaussian distribution on phase space.

Francisco Soto and Pierre Claverie give an elegant proof of this characterization, using the Segal–Bargmann transform. The reasoning is as follows. The Husimi Q function of $\psi$ may be computed as the squared magnitude of the Segal–Bargmann transform of $\psi$, multiplied by a Gaussian. Meanwhile, the Husimi Q function is the convolution of the Wigner function with a Gaussian. If the Wigner function of $\psi$ is non-negative everywhere on phase space, then the Husimi Q function will be strictly positive everywhere on phase space. Thus, the Segal–Bargmann transform $F(x + ip)$ of $\psi$ will be nowhere zero. Thus, by a standard result from complex analysis, we have
$$F(x + ip) = e^{g(x+ip)}$$
for some holomorphic function $g$. But in order for $F$ to belong to the Segal–Bargmann space—that is, for $F$ to be square-integrable with respect to a Gaussian measure—$g$ must have at most quadratic growth at infinity. From this, elementary complex analysis can be used to show that $g$ must actually be a quadratic polynomial. Thus, we obtain an explicit form of the Segal–Bargmann transform of any pure state whose Wigner function is non-negative. We can then invert the Segal–Bargmann transform to obtain the claimed form of the position wave function.

There does not appear to be any simple characterization of mixed states with non-negative Wigner functions.

== Interpretations of quantum mechanics ==
It has been shown that the Wigner quasiprobability distribution function can be regarded as an ħ-deformation of another phase-space distribution function that describes an ensemble of de Broglie–Bohm causal trajectories. Basil Hiley has shown that the quasi-probability distribution may be understood as the density matrix re-expressed in terms of a mean position and momentum of a "cell" in phase space, and the de Broglie–Bohm interpretation allows one to describe the dynamics of the centers of such "cells".

There is a close connection between the description of quantum states in terms of the Wigner function and a method of quantum states reconstruction in terms of mutually unbiased bases.

== Use outside quantum mechanics ==
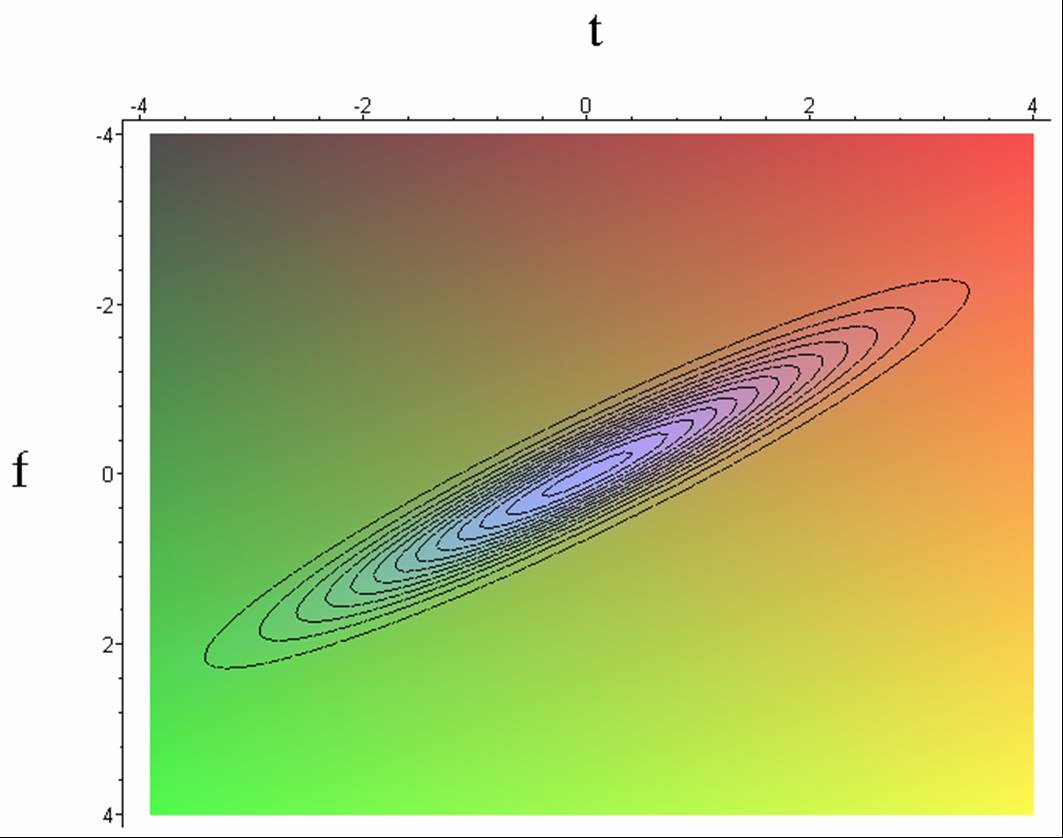
A contour plot of the Wigner–Ville distribution for a chirped pulse of light. The plot makes it obvious that the frequency is a linear function of time.

- In the modelling of optical systems such as telescopes or fibre telecommunications devices, the Wigner function is used to bridge the gap between simple ray tracing and the full wave analysis of the system. Here p/ħ is replaced with k = |k| sin θ ≈ |k|θ in the small-angle (paraxial) approximation. In this context, the Wigner function is the closest one can get to describing the system in terms of rays at position x and angle θ while still including the effects of interference. If it becomes negative at any point, then simple ray tracing will not suffice to model the system. That is to say, negative values of this function are a symptom of the Gabor limit of the classical light signal and not of quantum features of light associated with ħ.
- In signal analysis, a time-varying electrical signal, mechanical vibration, or sound wave are represented by a Wigner function. Here, x is replaced with the time, and p/ħ is replaced with the angular frequency ω = 2πf, where f is the regular frequency.
- In ultrafast optics, short laser pulses are characterized with the Wigner function using the same f and t substitutions as above. Pulse defects such as chirp (the change in frequency with time) can be visualized with the Wigner function. See adjacent figure.
- In quantum optics, x and p/ħ are replaced with the X and P quadratures, the real and imaginary components of the electric field (see coherent state).

== Characterization methods ==
- Quantum tomography
- Frequency-resolved optical gating

== Other related quasiprobability distributions ==
The Wigner distribution was the first quasiprobability distribution to be formulated, but many more followed, formally equivalent and transformable to and from it (see Transformation between distributions in time–frequency analysis). As in the case of coordinate systems, on account of varying properties, several such have with various advantages for specific applications:

- Glauber P representation
- Husimi Q representation

Nevertheless, in some sense, the Wigner distribution holds a privileged position among all these distributions, since it is the only one whose requisite star-product drops out (integrates out by parts to effective unity) in the evaluation of expectation values, as illustrated above, and so can be visualized as a quasiprobability measure analogous to the classical ones.

== History ==
The Wigner function was independently derived several times in different contexts. It was introduced by Eugene Wigner in 1932. Eugene Wigner was unaware that even within the context of quantum theory, it had been introduced a couple of years before by Werner Heisenberg and Paul Dirac, albeit purely formally: these two missed its significance, and that of its negative values, as they merely considered it as an approximation to the full quantum description of a system such as the atom.

It was later rederived by Jean Ville in 1948 as a quadratic (in signal) representation of the local time-frequency energy of a signal, effectively a spectrogram.

In 1949, José Enrique Moyal, who had derived it independently, recognized it as the quantum moment-generating functional, and thus as the basis of an elegant encoding of all quantum expectation values, and hence quantum mechanics, in phase space (see Phase-space formulation).

In most of his correspondence with Moyal in the mid-1940s, Dirac was unaware that Moyal's quantum-moment generating function was effectively the Wigner function, and it was Moyal who finally brought it to his attention.

== See also ==
- Heisenberg group
- Wigner–Weyl transform
- Phase space formulation
- Moyal bracket
- Negative probability
- Optical equivalence theorem
- Modified Wigner distribution function
- Cohen's class distribution function
- Wigner distribution function
- Transformation between distributions in time–frequency analysis
- Squeezed coherent state
- Bilinear time–frequency distribution
- Continuous-variable quantum information
- Margenau-Hill quasiprobability distribution
