= Kontsevich quantization formula =

In mathematics, the Kontsevich quantization formula describes how to construct a generalized ★-product operator algebra from a given arbitrary finite-dimensional Poisson manifold. This operator algebra amounts to the deformation quantization of the corresponding Poisson algebra. It is due to Maxim Kontsevich.

== Deformation quantization of a Poisson algebra ==
Given a Poisson algebra (A, {⋅, ⋅}), a deformation quantization is an associative unital product $\star$ on the algebra of formal power series in ħ, A[[ħ]], subject to the following two axioms,

$$\begin{align}
f\star g &=fg+\mathcal{O}(\hbar)\\
{}[f,g] &=f\star g-g\star f=i\hbar\{f,g\}+\mathcal{O}(\hbar^2)
\end{align}$$

If one were given a Poisson manifold (M, {⋅, ⋅}), one could ask, in addition, that

$$f\star g=fg+\sum_{k=1}^\infty \hbar^kB_k(f\otimes g),$$

where the B_{k} are linear bidifferential operators of degree at most k.

Two deformations are said to be equivalent iff they are related by a gauge transformation of the type,

$$\begin{cases}
D: A[[\hbar]]\to A[[\hbar]] \\
\sum_{k=0}^\infty \hbar^k f_k \mapsto \sum_{k=0}^\infty \hbar^k f_k +\sum_{n\ge1, k\ge0} D_n(f_k)\hbar^{n+k}
\end{cases}$$

where D_{n} are differential operators of order at most n. The corresponding induced $\star$-product, $\star'$, is then

$$f\,{\star}'\,g = D \left ( \left (D^{-1}f \right )\star \left (D^{-1}g \right ) \right ).$$

For the archetypal example, one may well consider Groenewold's original "Moyal–Weyl" $\star$-product.

== Kontsevich graphs ==
A Kontsevich graph is a simple directed graph without loops on 2 external vertices, labeled f and g; and n internal vertices, labeled Π. From each internal vertex originate two edges. All (equivalence classes of) graphs with n internal vertices are accumulated in the set G_{n}(2).

An example on two internal vertices is the following graph,

=== Associated bidifferential operator ===
Associated to each graph Γ, there is a bidifferential operator B_{Γ}( f, g) defined as follows. For each edge there is a partial derivative on the symbol of the target vertex. It is contracted with the corresponding index from the source symbol. The term for the graph Γ is the product of all its symbols together with their partial derivatives. Here f and g stand for smooth functions on the manifold, and Π is the Poisson bivector of the Poisson manifold.

The term for the example graph is

$$\Pi^{i_2j_2}\partial_{i_2}\Pi^{i_1j_1}\partial_{i_1}f\,\partial_{j_1}\partial_{j_2}g.$$

=== Associated weight ===
For adding up these bidifferential operators there are the weights w_{Γ} of the graph Γ. First of all, to each graph there is a multiplicity m(Γ) which counts how many equivalent configurations there are for one graph. The rule is that the sum of the multiplicities for all graphs with n internal vertices is (n(n + 1))^{n}. The sample graph above has the multiplicity m(Γ) = 8. For this, it is helpful to enumerate the internal vertices from 1 to n.

In order to compute the weight we have to integrate products of the angle in the upper half-plane, H, as follows. The upper half-plane is H ⊂ $\mathbb{C}$, endowed with the Poincaré metric

$$ds^2=\frac{dx^2+dy^2}{y^2};$$

and, for two points z, w ∈ H with z ≠ w, we measure the angle φ between the geodesic from z to i∞ and from z to w counterclockwise. This is

$$\phi(z,w)=\frac{1}{2i}\log\frac{(z-w)(z-\bar{w})}{(\bar{z}-w)(\bar{z}-\bar{w})}.$$

The integration domain is C_{n}(H) the space

$$C_n(H):=\{(u_1,\dots,u_n)\in H^n: u_i\ne u_j\forall i\ne j\}.$$

The formula amounts

$$w_\Gamma:= \frac{m(\Gamma)}{(2\pi)^{2n}n!}\int_{C_n(H)} \bigwedge_{j=1}^n\mathrm{d}\phi(u_j,u_{t1(j)})\wedge\mathrm{d}\phi(u_j,u_{t2(j)})$$,

where t1(j) and t2(j) are the first and second target vertex of the internal vertex j. The vertices f and g are at the fixed positions 0 and 1 in H.

== The formula ==
Given the above three definitions, the Kontsevich formula for a star product is now

$$f\star g = fg+\sum_{n=1}^\infty\left(\frac{i\hbar}{2}\right)^n \sum_{\Gamma \in G_n(2)} w_\Gamma B_\Gamma(f\otimes g).$$

=== Explicit formula up to second order ===
Enforcing associativity of the $\star$-product, it is straightforward to check directly that the Kontsevich formula must reduce, to second order in ħ, to just

$$\begin{align}
f\star g &= fg +\tfrac{i\hbar}{2}\Pi^{ij}\partial_i f\,\partial_j g -\tfrac{\hbar^2}{8}\Pi^{i_1j_1}\Pi^{i_2j_2}\partial_{i_1}\,\partial_{i_2}f \partial_{j_1}\,\partial_{j_2}g\\
& - \tfrac{\hbar^2}{12}\Pi^{i_1j_1}\partial_{j_1}\Pi^{i_2j_2}(\partial_{i_1}\partial_{i_2}f \,\partial_{j_2}g -\partial_{i_2}f\,\partial_{i_1}\partial_{j_2}g) +\mathcal{O}(\hbar^3)
\end{align}$$
