= Moyal product =

Example of a phase-space star product in mathematics

In mathematics, the Moyal product (after José Enrique Moyal; also called the star product or Weyl–Groenewold product, after Hermann Weyl and Hilbrand J. Groenewold) is an example of a phase-space star product. It is an associative, non-commutative product, ★, on the functions on $\mathbb{R}^{2n}$, equipped with its Poisson bracket (with a generalization to symplectic manifolds, described below). It is a special case of the ★-product of the "algebra of symbols" of a universal enveloping algebra.

== Historical comments ==
The Moyal product is named after José Enrique Moyal, but is also sometimes called the Weyl–Groenewold product as it was introduced by H. J. Groenewold in his 1946 doctoral dissertation, in a trenchant appreciation of the Weyl correspondence. Moyal actually appears not to know about the product in his celebrated article and was crucially lacking it in his legendary correspondence with Dirac, as illustrated in his biography. The popular naming after Moyal appears to have emerged only in the 1970s, in homage to his flat phase-space quantization picture.

== Definition ==
The product for smooth functions f and g on $\mathbb{R}^{2n}$ takes the form
$$f \star g = fg + \sum_{n=1}^\infty \hbar^n C_n(f,g),$$
where each C_{n} is a certain bidifferential operator of order n, characterized by the following properties (see below for an explicit formula):

- $f \star g = fg + \mathcal O(\hbar),$ Deformation of the pointwise product — implicit in the formula above.
- $f \star g - g \star f = i\hbar\{f,g\} + \mathcal O(\hbar^3) \equiv i\hbar \{\{f,g\}\},$ Deformation of the Poisson bracket, called Moyal bracket.
- $f \star 1 = 1 \star f = f,$ The 1 of the undeformed algebra is also the identity in the new algebra.
- $\overline{f \star g} = \overline{g} \star \overline{f},$ The complex conjugate is an antilinear antiautomorphism.

Note that, if one wishes to take functions valued in the real numbers, then an alternative version eliminates the i in the second condition and eliminates the fourth condition.

If one restricts to polynomial functions, the above algebra is isomorphic to the Weyl algebra A_{n}, and the two offer alternative realizations of the Weyl map of the space of polynomials in n variables (or the symmetric algebra of a vector space of dimension 2n).

To provide an explicit formula, consider a constant Poisson bivector Π on $\mathbb{R}^{2n}$:
$$\Pi = \sum_{i,j} \Pi^{ij} \partial_i \wedge \partial_j,$$
where Π^{ij} is a real number for each i, j. The star product of two functions f and g can then be defined as the pseudo-differential operator acting on both of them,
$$f \star g = fg + \frac{i\hbar}{2} \sum_{i,j} \Pi^{ij} (\partial_i f) (\partial_j g)
- \frac{\hbar^2}{8} \sum_{i,j,k,m} \Pi^{ij} \Pi^{km} (\partial_i \partial_k f) (\partial_j \partial_m g) + \ldots,$$
where ħ is the reduced Planck constant, treated as a formal parameter here.

This is a special case of what is known as the Berezin formula on the algebra of symbols and can be given a closed form (which follows from the Baker–Campbell–Hausdorff formula). The closed form can be obtained by using the exponential:
$$f \star g = m \circ e^{\frac{i\hbar}{2} \Pi}(f \otimes g),$$
where m is the multiplication map, m(a ⊗ b) = ab, and the exponential is treated as a power series,
$$e^A = \sum_{n=0}^\infty \frac{1}{n!} A^n.$$

That is, the formula for C_{n} is
$$C_n = \frac{i^n}{2^n n!} m \circ \Pi^n.$$

As indicated, often one eliminates all occurrences of i above, and the formulas then restrict naturally to real numbers.

Note that if the functions f and g are polynomials, the above infinite sums become finite (reducing to the ordinary Weyl-algebra case).

The relationship of the Moyal product to the generalized ★-product used in the definition of the "algebra of symbols" of a universal enveloping algebra follows from the fact that the Weyl algebra is the universal enveloping algebra of the Heisenberg algebra (modulo that the center equals the unit).

== On manifolds ==
On any symplectic manifold, one can, at least locally, choose coordinates so as to make the symplectic structure constant, by Darboux's theorem; and, using the associated Poisson bivector, one may consider the above formula. For it to work globally, as a function on the whole manifold (and not just a local formula), one must equip the symplectic manifold with a torsion-free symplectic connection. This makes it a Fedosov manifold.

More general results for arbitrary Poisson manifolds (where the Darboux theorem does not apply) are given by the Kontsevich quantization formula.

== Examples ==
A simple explicit example of the construction and utility of the ★-product (for the simplest case of a two-dimensional euclidean phase space) is given in the article on the Wigner–Weyl transform: two Gaussians compose with this ★-product according to a hyperbolic tangent law:
$$\exp\left[-a\left(q^2 + p^2\right)\right] \star \exp\left[-b\left(q^2 + p^2\right)\right] =
\frac{1}{1 + \hbar^2 ab} \exp\left[-\frac{a + b}{1 + \hbar^2 ab} \left(q^2 + p^2\right)\right].$$
Equivalently,
$$e^{-\tanh (a) \frac{q^2 + p^2}{\hbar }} \star e^{-\tanh (b) \frac{q^2 + p^2}{\hbar }}
=
\frac{\tanh (a + b)}{\tanh (a) + \tanh (b)} e^{-\tanh (a+b) \frac{q^2 + p^2}{\hbar }}$$
The classical limit at $\hbar \to 0, a/\hbar \to \alpha, b / \hbar \to \beta$ is $e^{-\alpha(q^2+p^2)} e^{-\beta(q^2+p^2)} = e^{-(\alpha + \beta)(q^2+p^2)}$, as expected.

Every correspondence prescription between phase space and Hilbert space, however, induces its own proper ★-product.

Similar results are seen in the Segal–Bargmann space and in the theta representation of the Heisenberg group, where the creation and annihilation operators a^{∗} = z and a = ∂/∂z are understood to act on the complex plane (respectively, the upper half-plane for the Heisenberg group), so that the position and momenta operators are given by $q =\frac{a + a^*}{2}$ and $p = \frac{a - a^*}{2i}$. This situation is clearly different from the case where the positions are taken to be real-valued, but does offer insights into the overall algebraic structure of the Heisenberg algebra and its envelope, the Weyl algebra.

== Inside phase-space integrals ==
Inside a phase-space integral, just one star product of the Moyal type may be dropped, resulting in plain multiplication, as evident by integration by parts,
$$\int dx\,dp\;f\star g= \int dx\,dp ~f ~g,$$
making the cyclicity of the phase-space trace manifest. This is a unique property of the above specific Moyal product, and does not hold for other correspondence rules' star products, such as Husimi's, etc.
