= Ann Moyal =

Australian historian (1926–2019)

Ann Moyal AM FAHA FRSN
- Born: Ann Veronica Helen Hurley; 23 February 1926; Northbridge, New South Wales, Australia
- Died: 21 July 2019 (aged 93)
- Education: University of Sydney
- Spouses: Michael Cousins (m. 1951; div. 1954) Everest Mozley (m. 1957, divorced) José Moyal (m. 1962; died 1998)

Ann Veronica Helen Moyal (née Hurley, formerly Cousins and Mozley; 23 February 1926 – 21 July 2019) was an Australian historian known for her work in the history of science. She held academic positions at the Australian National University (ANU), New South Wales Institute of Technology, and Griffith University, and later worked as an independent scholar.

== Early life ==
Moyal was born on 23 February 1926 in Northbridge, Sydney, New South Wales. Her father was a bank teller. She grew up in Sydney, but was sent to Canberra High School for her final year of secondary schooling. She graduated Bachelor of Arts with first-class honours from the University of Sydney, and was subsequently awarded a scholarship to the University of London. However, she abandoned her postgraduate studies after a year to become a research assistant.

== Career ==
Moyal worked as a research assistant to Lord Beaverbrook from 1954 to 1958, while he was working on Men and Power 1917–1918. She checked sources and wrote drafts, working with him at his London penthouse, his country estate Cherkley Court, and his villa at Cap-d'Ail, France. In her memoirs she recalled being asked to entertain Winston Churchill at Cap-d'Ail by swimming laps in a pool. Beaverbrook sacked her when she informed him she would be marrying for a second time. After returning to Australia, Moyal declined a PhD scholarship to the Australian National University (ANU) and instead became the inaugural assistant editor of the university's Australian Dictionary of Biography, under Keith Hancock. Manning Clark described her as "one of the unsung heroines in the turbulent years" of the project. She left the dictionary in 1962 to become a research associate at the Australian Academy of Science and the ANU Research School of Social Sciences.

Moyal's later career focused on the history of science. She was a science editor with University of Chicago Press (1967–1970) and from 1972 lectured at the New South Wales Institute of Technology. A 1975 article on the Australian Atomic Energy Commission "made her reputation as the leading Australian expert on the history of atomic energy in Australia ". From 1977 to 1979 she was the director of the Centre for Science Policy at Griffith University. Moyal's later career was conducted as an independent scholar, and in 1995 she helped establish the Independent Scholars Association of Australia; she served as the organisation's president until 2000. In 1996, she curated an exhibition on Australian scientists for the National Portrait Gallery.

=== Honours and legacy ===
Moyal was a Fellow of the Royal Society of New South Wales (FRSN) and elected an Honorary Fellow of the Australian Academy of the Humanities (FAHA) in 1997. She was appointed Member of the Order of Australia (AM) in 1993 for her "contribution to the history of Australian science and technology especially the writing of its history", and also received the Centenary Medal. She was awarded honorary Doctor of Letters degrees from ANU (2003) and the University of Sydney (2007). She was posthumously awarded the 2020 Archibald Ollé Prize for the best paper ("P.A.M. Dirac and the maverick mathematician") published in the Journal & Proceedings of the Royal Society of New South Wales, in 2017.

The inaugural Ann Moyal Lecture was given by cultural anthropologist Genevieve Bell on 8 May 2023 at the National Library of Australia and will be an annual event.

== Bibliography ==
=== Books ===
- Truant Surgeon (1963) (ed.) (Note: The memoirs of Australian prime minister Earle Page.)
- A Guide to the Manuscript Records of Australian Science (1966)
- Scientists in Nineteenth Century Australia: A Documentary History (1976)
- Clear Across Australia: A History of Telecommunications (1984)
- A Bright and Savage Land: Scientists in Colonial Australia (1986)
- Women and the Telephone in Australia (1989)
- Platypus: The Extraordinary Story of How a Curious Creature Baffled the World (2001)
- The Web of Science: The Scientific Correspondence of the Rev WB Clarke, Australia’s Pioneer Geologist (2003)
- Koala: A Historical Biography (2006)
- Maverick Mathematician : The Life and Science of J.E. Moyal (2006), ANU E-press, ISBN 978-1920942588

Memoirs

- Breakfast with Beaverbrook: Memoirs of an Independent Woman (1995)
- A Woman of Influence: Science, Men & History (2014)

=== Articles ===
- Moyal, Ann (March 2015). "Isobel Bennett : doyenne of the seashores" (PDF). The National Library of Australia Magazine. 7 (1): 14–17.

———————

== Personal life ==
Moyal married three times: to Michael Cousins in 1951, to Colonel Everest Mozley in 1957, and to mathematician José Enrique Moyal in 1962. She took her husband's name on each occasion. Her first two marriages ended in divorce, and she was widowed in 1998.

Moyal died on 21 July 2019, aged 93.
