= Wigner–Weyl transform =

Mapping between functions in the quantum phase space

In quantum mechanics, the Wigner–Weyl transform or Weyl–Wigner transform (after Hermann Weyl and Eugene Wigner) is the invertible mapping between functions in the quantum phase space formulation and Hilbert space operators in the Schrödinger picture.

Often the mapping from functions on phase space to operators is called the Weyl transform or Weyl quantization, whereas the inverse mapping, from operators to functions on phase space, is called the Wigner transform. This mapping was originally devised by Hermann Weyl in 1927 in an attempt to map symmetrized classical phase space functions to operators, a procedure known as Weyl quantization. It is now understood that Weyl quantization does not satisfy all the properties one would require for consistent quantization and therefore sometimes yields unphysical answers. On the other hand, some of the nice properties described below suggest that if one seeks a single consistent procedure mapping functions on the classical phase space to operators, the Weyl quantization is the best option: a sort of normal coordinates of such maps. (Groenewold's theorem asserts that no such map can have all the ideal properties one would desire.)

Regardless, the Weyl–Wigner transform is a well-defined integral transform between the phase-space and operator representations, and yields insight into the workings of quantum mechanics. Most importantly, the Wigner quasi-probability distribution is the Wigner transform of the quantum density matrix, and, conversely, the density matrix is the Weyl transform of the Wigner function.

In contrast to Weyl's original intentions in seeking a consistent quantization scheme, this map merely amounts to a change of representation within quantum mechanics; it need not connect "classical" with "quantum" quantities. For example, the phase-space function may depend explicitly on the reduced Planck constant ħ, as it does in some familiar cases involving angular momentum. This invertible representation change then allows one to express quantum mechanics in phase space, as was appreciated in the 1940s by Hilbrand J. Groenewold and José Enrique Moyal.

In more generality, Weyl quantization is studied in cases where the phase space is a symplectic manifold, or possibly a Poisson manifold. Related structures include the Poisson–Lie groups and Kac–Moody algebras.

== Definition of the Weyl quantization of a general observable ==
The following explains the Weyl transformation on the simplest, two-dimensional Euclidean phase space. Let the coordinates on phase space be (q,p), and let f be a function defined everywhere on phase space. In what follows, we fix operators P and Q satisfying the canonical commutation relations, such as the usual position and momentum operators in the Schrödinger representation. We assume that the exponentiated operators $e^{iaQ}$ and $e^{ibP}$ constitute an irreducible representation of the Weyl relations, so that the Stone–von Neumann theorem (guaranteeing uniqueness of the canonical commutation relations) holds.

=== Basic formula ===
The Weyl transform (or Weyl quantization) of the function f is given by the following operator in Hilbert space,

$\Phi [f] = \frac{1}{(2\pi)^2}\iint\!\!\! \iint f(q,p) \left(e^{i(a(Q-q) +b(P-p))}\right) \text{d}q\, \text{d}p\, \text{d}a\, \text{d}b.$

Throughout, ħ is the reduced Planck constant.

It is instructive to perform the p and q integrals in the above formula first, which has the effect of computing the ordinary Fourier transform $\tilde{f}$ of the function f, while leaving the operator $e^{i(aQ+bP)}$. In that case, the Weyl transform can be written as

$$\Phi [f] = \frac{1}{(2\pi)^2}\iint\tilde{f}(a,b)e^{iaQ+ibP}\,da\,db$$.

We may therefore think of the Weyl map as follows: We take the ordinary Fourier transform of the function $f(p,q)$, but then when applying the Fourier inversion formula, we substitute the quantum operators $P$ and $Q$ for the original classical variables p and q, thus obtaining a "quantum version of f."

A less symmetric form, but handy for applications, is the following,

$$\Phi [f]= \frac{2}{(2\pi \hbar)^{3/2}}\iint \!\!\!\iint\!\! dq\, dp\, d\tilde{x} \, d\tilde{p}  \ e^{ \frac{i}{\hbar} (\tilde {x} \tilde {p}  -2(\tilde{p}-p)(\tilde{x}-q))}~ f(q,p) ~ |\tilde{x}\rangle\langle \tilde{p}|.$$

=== In the position representation ===
The Weyl map may then also be expressed in terms of the integral kernel matrix elements of this operator,

$$\langle x| \Phi [f] |y \rangle = \int_{-\infty}^\infty {\text{d}p\over h} ~e^{ip(x-y)/\hbar}~ f\left({x+y\over2},p\right) .$$

=== Inverse map ===
The inverse of the above Weyl map is the Wigner map (or Wigner transform), which was introduced by Eugene Wigner, which takes the operator Φ back to the original phase-space kernel function f,

$f(q,p)= 2 \int_{-\infty}^\infty \text{d}y~e^{-2ipy/\hbar}~ \langle q+y| \Phi [f] |q-y \rangle.$

For example, the Wigner map of the oscillator thermal distribution operator $\exp (-\beta (P^2+Q^2)/2)$ is

$$\exp_\star \left (-\beta (p^2+q^2)/2  \right )=
\left ( \cosh\left(\frac{ \beta \hbar}{2}\right)\right ) ^{-1}
\exp\left ( \frac{-2}{\hbar} \tanh\left(\frac{\beta\hbar}{2}\right)  (p^2+q^2)/2\right )  .$$

If one replaces $\Phi[f]$ in the above expression with an arbitrary operator, the resulting function f may depend on the reduced Planck constant ħ, and may well describe quantum-mechanical processes, provided it is properly composed through the star product, below. In turn, the Weyl map of the Wigner map is summarized by Groenewold's formula,

$$\Phi [f] = h \iint  \,da\,db   ~e^{iaQ+ibP}   \operatorname{Tr} ( e^{-iaQ-ibP} \Phi).$$

=== Weyl quantization of polynomial observables ===
While the above formulas give a nice understanding of the Weyl quantization of a very general observable on phase space, they are not very convenient for computing on simple observables, such as those that are polynomials in $q$ and $p$. In later sections, we will see that on such polynomials, the Weyl quantization represents the totally symmetric ordering of the noncommuting operators $Q$ and $P$. For example, the Wigner map of the quantum angular-momentum-squared operator L^{2} is not just the classical angular momentum squared, but it further contains an offset term −3ħ^{2}/2, which accounts for the nonvanishing angular momentum of the ground-state Bohr orbit.

== Properties ==
=== Weyl quantization of polynomials ===
The action of the Weyl quantization on polynomial functions of $q$ and $p$ is completely determined by the following symmetric formula:

$$(aq+bp)^n\longmapsto (aQ+bP)^n$$

for all complex numbers $a$ and $b$. From this formula, it is not hard to show that the Weyl quantization on a function of the form $q^k p^l$ gives the average of all possible orderings of $k$ factors of $Q$ and $l$ factors of $P$:
$$\prod_{j=1}^N \xi_{k_j} ~~ \longmapsto ~~
\frac{1}{N!} \sum_{\sigma \in S_N} \prod_{j=1}^N \Xi_{k_{\sigma(j)}}$$
where $\xi_j = q_j, \xi_{n + j} = p_j$, and $S_N$ is the set of permutations on N elements.

For example, we have

$$6 p^2 q^2 ~~ \longmapsto ~~ P^2 Q^2 + Q^2  P^2 + PQPQ+PQ^2P+QPQP+QP^2Q.$$

While this result is conceptually natural, it is not convenient for computations when $k$ and $l$ are large. In such cases, we can use instead McCoy's formula

$$p^m q^n ~~ \longmapsto ~~ {1 \over 2^n}
\sum_{r=0}^{n} {n \choose r}
Q^r  P^m  Q^{n-r}={1 \over 2^m}\sum_{s=0}^{m} {m \choose s} P^s Q^{n}P^{m-s}.$$

This expression gives an apparently different answer for the case of $p^2 q^2$ from the totally symmetric expression above. There is no contradiction, however, since the canonical commutation relations allow for more than one expression for the same operator. (The reader may find it instructive to use the commutation relations to rewrite the totally symmetric formula for the case of $p^2q^2$ in terms of the operators $P^2Q^2$, $QP^2Q$, and $Q^2P^2$ and verify the first expression in McCoy's formula with $m=n=2$.)

It is widely thought that the Weyl quantization, among all quantization schemes, comes as close as possible to mapping the Poisson bracket on the classical side to the commutator on the quantum side. (An exact correspondence is impossible, in light of Groenewold's theorem.) For example, Moyal showed the

Theorem: If $f(q,p)$ is a polynomial of degree at most 2 and $g(q,p)$ is an arbitrary polynomial, then we have $\Phi(\{f,g\})=\frac{1}{i\hbar}[\Phi(f),\Phi(g)]$.

=== Weyl quantization of general functions ===
- If f is a real-valued function, then its Weyl-map image Φ[f] is self-adjoint.
- If f is an element of Schwartz space, then Φ[f] is trace-class.
- More generally, Φ[f] is a densely defined unbounded operator.
- The map Φ[f] is one-to-one on the Schwartz space (as a subspace of the square-integrable functions).

== See also ==
- Canonical commutation relation
- Deformation quantization
- Heisenberg group
- Moyal bracket
- Weyl algebra
- Functor
- Pseudo-differential operator
- Wigner quasi-probability distribution
- Stone–von Neumann theorem
- Phase space formulation of quantum mechanics
- Kontsevich quantization formula
- Gabor–Wigner transform
- Oscillator representation
