= José Enrique Moyal =

- יוסף הנרי מויאל
- Born: 1 October 1910; Jerusalem, Mutasarrifate of Jerusalem, Ottoman Empire
- Died: 22 May 1998 (aged 87); Canberra, Australia
- Education: Supélec; University of Paris
- Known for: Moyal's evolution equation Moyal product Moyal quantization Moyal bracket Kramers–Moyal expansion
- Spouses: Susanna Pollack (div. 1956) Ann Moyal (m. 1962)
- Scientific career
- Fields: Mathematical physics Mathematics; Statistics

José Enrique Moyal (Hebrew: יוסף הנרי מויאל; 1 October 1910 – 22 May 1998) was an Australian mathematician and mathematical physicist who contributed to aeronautical engineering, electrical engineering and statistics, among other fields.

== Career ==
Moyal helped establish the phase space formulation of quantum mechanics in 1949 by bringing together the ideas of Hermann Weyl, John von Neumann, Eugene Wigner, and Hip Groenewold.

This formulation is statistical in nature and makes logical connections between quantum mechanics and classical statistical mechanics, enabling a natural comparison between the two formulations. Phase space quantization, also known as Moyal quantization, largely avoids the use of operators for quantum mechanical observables prevalent in the canonical formulation. Quantum-mechanical evolution in phase space is specified by a Moyal bracket.

Moyal grew up in Tel Aviv, and attended the Herzliya Hebrew Gymnasium. He studied in Paris in the 1930s, at the École Supérieure d'Electricité, Institut de Statistique, and, finally, at the Institut Henri Poincaré. His work was carried out in wartime England in the 1940s, while employed at the de Havilland Aircraft company.

Moyal was a professor of mathematics at the former School of Mathematics and Physics of Macquarie University, where he was a colleague of John Clive Ward. Previously, he had worked at the Argonne National Laboratory in Illinois.

He published pioneering work on stochastic processes.

== Personal life ==
Moyal was married to Susanna Pollack (1912–2000), with whom he had two children, Orah Young (born in Tel Aviv) and David Moyal (born in Belfast). They divorced in 1956. He was married to Ann Moyal from 1962 until his death.

== Works ==
- Moyal, J. E. (1949). "Quantum mechanics as a statistical theory". Mathematical Proceedings of the Cambridge Philosophical Society. 45 (1): 99–124. Bibcode:1949PCPS...45...99M. doi:10.1017/S0305004100000487. S2CID 124183640.
- J.E. Moyal, "Stochastic Processes and Statistical Physics" Journal of the Royal Statistical Society B, 11, (1949), 150–210.

== See also ==
- Moyal bracket
- Wigner–Weyl transform
- Wigner quasiprobability distribution
