= Hilbrand J. Groenewold =

Dutch theoretical physicist (1910–1996)

- Born: Hilbrand Johannes Groenewold; 29 June 1910; Muntendam, Netherlands
- Died: 23 November 1996 (aged 86); Groningen, Netherlands
- Known for: Groenewold's theorem Weyl–Groenewold product Phase-space formulation
- Scientific career
- Fields: Quantum physics
- Doctoral advisor: Léon Rosenfeld

Hilbrand Johannes "Hip" Groenewold (1910–1996) was a Dutch theoretical physicist who pioneered the largely operator-free formulation of quantum mechanics in phase space known as phase-space quantization.

== Biography ==
Groenewold was born on 29 June 1910 in Muntendam in the province of Groningen. He graduated from the University of Groningen, with a major in physics and minors in mathematics and mechanics in 1934. After a visit to Cambridge to interact with John von Neumann (1934–5) on the links between classical and quantum mechanics, and a checkered career working with Frits Zernike in Groningen, then Leiden, the Hague, De Bilt, and several addresses in the North of the Netherlands during World War II, he earned his Ph.D. degree in 1946, under the tutelage of Léon Rosenfeld at Utrecht University. In 1951, he obtained a position in Groningen in theoretical physics, first as a lecturer, then as a senior lecturer, and finally as a professor in 1955. He was the initiator and organizer of the Vosbergen Conference in the Netherlands for over two decades.

His 1946 thesis paper laid the foundations of quantum mechanics in phase space, in unwitting parallel with J. E. Moyal. This treatise was the first to achieve full understanding of the Wigner–Weyl transform as an invertible transform, rather than as an unsatisfactory quantization rule. Significantly, this work further formulated and first appreciated the all-important star-product, the cornerstone of this formulation of the theory, ironically often also associated with Moyal's name, even though it is not featured in Moyal's papers and was not fully understood by Moyal.

Moreover, Groenewold first understood and demonstrated that the Moyal bracket is isomorphic to the quantum commutator, and thus that the latter cannot be made to faithfully correspond to the Poisson bracket, as had been envisioned by Paul Dirac. This observation and his counterexamples contrasting Poisson brackets to commutators have been generalized and codified to what is now known as the Groenewold–Van Hove theorem. See Groenewold's theorem for one version.

Philosopher Toby Ord, in his 2020 book The Precipice: Existential Risk and the Future of Humanity, identified a pioneering discussion of general global catastrophic risk in Groenewold's 1968 paper "Modern Science and Social Responsibility", which Ord described as:

A very early piece that anticipated several key ideas of existential risk. It failed to reach a wide audience, leaving these ideas in obscurity until they were independently discovered decades later.
