= Moyal bracket =

Suitably normalized antisymmetrization of the phase-space star product

In physics, the Moyal bracket is the suitably normalized antisymmetrization of the phase-space star product.

The Moyal bracket was developed in about 1940 by José Enrique Moyal, but Moyal only succeeded in publishing his work in 1949 after a lengthy dispute with Paul Dirac. In the meantime this idea was independently introduced in 1946 by Hip Groenewold.

== Overview ==
The Moyal bracket is a way of describing the commutator of observables in the phase space formulation of quantum mechanics when these observables are described as functions on phase space. It relies on schemes for identifying functions on phase space with quantum observables, the most famous of these schemes being the Wigner–Weyl transform. It underlies Moyal's dynamical equation, an equivalent formulation of Heisenberg's quantum equation of motion, thereby providing the quantum generalization of Hamilton's equations.

Mathematically, it is a deformation of the phase-space Poisson bracket (essentially an extension of it), the deformation parameter being the reduced Planck constant ħ. Thus, its group contraction ħ→0 yields the Poisson bracket Lie algebra.

Up to formal equivalence, the Moyal Bracket is the unique one-parameter Lie-algebraic deformation of the Poisson bracket. Its algebraic isomorphism to the algebra of commutators bypasses the negative result of the Groenewold–van Hove theorem, which precludes such an isomorphism for the Poisson bracket, a question implicitly raised by Dirac in his 1926 doctoral thesis, the "method of classical analogy" for quantization.

For instance, in a two-dimensional flat phase space, and for the Weyl-map correspondence, the Moyal bracket reads,

$$\begin{align}
\{\{f,g\}\} & \stackrel{\mathrm{def}}{=}\  \frac{1}{i\hbar}(f\star  g-g\star  f) \\
& = \{f,g\} + O(\hbar^2), \\
\end{align}$$

where ★ is the star-product operator in phase space (cf. Moyal product), while f and g are differentiable phase-space functions, and {f, g} is their Poisson bracket.

More specifically, in operational calculus language, this equals

$\{\{f,g\}\}\ = \frac{2}{\hbar} ~ f(x,p)\ \sin \left ( {{\tfrac{\hbar }{2}}(\overleftarrow{\partial }_{\!\!x} \overrightarrow{\partial }_{\!\!p}-\overleftarrow{\partial }_{\!\!p}\overrightarrow{\partial }_{\!\!x})} \right ) \ g(x,p).$

The left & right arrows over the partial derivatives denote the left & right partial derivatives. Sometimes the Moyal bracket is referred to as the Sine bracket.

A popular (Fourier) integral representation for it, introduced by George Baker is

$$\{ \{ f,g \} \}(x,p) = {2 \over \hbar^3 \pi^2 } \int dp' \, dp'' \, dx' \, dx'' f(x+x',p+p') g(x+x'',p+p'')\sin \left( \tfrac{2}{\hbar} (x'p''-x''p')\right)~.$$

Each correspondence map from phase space to Hilbert space induces a characteristic "Moyal" bracket (such as the one illustrated here for the Weyl map). All such Moyal brackets are formally equivalent among themselves, in accordance with a systematic theory.

The Moyal bracket specifies the eponymous infinite-dimensional Lie algebra—it is antisymmetric in its arguments f and g, and satisfies the Jacobi identity. The corresponding abstract Lie algebra is realized by T_{f} ≡ f★, so that

$$[ T_f  ~, T_g ] = T_{i\hbar \{ \{ f,g \} \} }.$$

On a 2-torus phase space, T ^{2}, with periodic coordinates x and p, each in [0,2π], and integer mode indices m_{i} , for basis functions exp(i (m_{1}x+m_{2}p)), this Lie algebra reads,

$$[ T_{m_1,m_2} ~ , T_{n_1,n_2}  ] =
2i \sin \left (\tfrac{\hbar}{2}(n_1 m_2 - n_2 m_1 )\right ) ~ T_{m_1+n_1,m_2+ n_2}, ~$$

which reduces to SU(N) for integer N ≡ 4π/ħ. SU(N) then emerges as a deformation of SU(∞), with deformation parameter 1/N.

Generalization of the Moyal bracket for quantum systems with second-class constraints involves an operation on equivalence classes of functions in phase space, which can be considered as a quantum deformation of the Dirac bracket.

== Sine bracket and cosine bracket ==
Next to the sine bracket discussed, Groenewold further introduced the cosine bracket, elaborated by Baker,

$$\begin{align}
\{ \{ \{f ,g\} \} \} & \stackrel{\mathrm{def}}{=}\  \tfrac{1}{2}(f\star  g+g\star  f)  = f g + O(\hbar^2). \\
\end{align}$$

Here, again, ★ is the star-product operator in phase space, f and g are differentiable phase-space functions, and f g is the ordinary product.

The sine and cosine brackets are, respectively, the results of antisymmetrizing and symmetrizing the star product. Thus, as the sine bracket is the Wigner map of the commutator, the cosine bracket is the Wigner image of the anticommutator in standard quantum mechanics. Similarly, as the Moyal bracket equals the Poisson bracket up to higher orders of ħ, the cosine bracket equals the ordinary product up to higher orders of ħ. In the classical limit, the Moyal bracket helps reduction to the Liouville equation (formulated in terms of the Poisson bracket), as the cosine bracket leads to the classical Hamilton–Jacobi equation.

The sine and cosine bracket also stand in relation to equations of a purely algebraic description of quantum mechanics.
