= List of things named after Eugene Wigner =

The following is a list of things named after Hungarian physicist E. P. Wigner.

== Physics ==
- Bloch–Wigner function
- Breit–Wigner distribution (disambiguation)
  - Relativistic Breit–Wigner distribution
- Bargmann–Wigner equations
- Jordan–Wigner transformation
- Newton–Wigner localization
- Polynomial Wigner–Ville distribution
- Thomas–Wigner rotation
- Von Neumann–Wigner theorem
- Way–Wigner formula
- Wigner 3-j symbols
- Wigner's 6-j symbols
- Wigner's 9-j symbols
- Wigner–Araki–Yanase theorem
- Wigner–Yanase skew information
- Wigner–Yanase–Dyson conjecture
- Wigner–Eckart theorem
- Wigner–Inonu contraction
- Wigner interpretation
- Wigner–Seitz cell
- Wigner–Seitz radius
- Wigner–Weyl transform
- Wigner–Wilkins spectrum
- Wigner's classification
- Wigner quasi-probability distribution
- Wigner's friend
- Wigner's theorem
- Wigner crystal
- Wigner D-matrix
- Wigner effect
- Wigner energy
- Wigner lattice
- Wigner poisoning, Xe-135 "poisoning" in nuclear reactors poisoning.
- Wigner rotation
- Wigner–Witmer correlation rules

== Mathematics ==
- Gabor–Wigner transform
- Modified Wigner distribution function
- Wigner distribution function
- Wigner semicircle distribution
- Wigner surmise

== Other ==
- Wigner fusion
- Wigner Research Centre for Physics in Budapest, which houses the Wigner Data Center.
- Eugene P. Wigner Reactor Physicist Award at the American Nuclear Society.
- Wigner Fellowship Program at Oak Ridge National Laboratory (ORNL).
- Eugene-Wigner-Colloquium at the Institut für Theoretische Physik of Technische Universität Berlin.
- Eugene-Paul-Wigner-Building at Technische Universität Berlin.
- The Eugene P. Wigner Auditorium at Oak Ridge National Laboratory
- Eugene P. Wigner Institute at the Ettore Majorana Foundation and Centre for Scientific Culture in Erice, Sicily
