= Margenau-Hill quasiprobability distribution =

Mathematical tool used in quantum mechanics

The Margenau-Hill quasiprobability distribution (MH) is a mathematical tool used in quantum mechanics, particularly in quantum information science, quantum optics, and quantum thermodynamics, to describe the joint "quasiprobability" of outcomes for measurements of multiple, potentially non-commuting observables (quantities that cannot be precisely measured simultaneously). It is commonly used as a phase-space description of quantum states, similar to the Wigner quasiprobability distribution and Kirkwood–Dirac quasiprobability distribution. It was introduced by Henry Margenau and Robert Nyden Hill in 1961.

== Definition ==
A probability distribution $p(a):X \mapsto [0,1]$ is a non-negative function such that

$\int_X p(a) \, \mathrm{d}a = 1.$

A quasiprobability distribution is a real- or complex-valued function $Q(a)$ such that

$\int Q(a) \, \mathrm{d}a = 1,$

where the integral is a definite integral over some relevant domain. Quasiprobability distributions are also known as signed probability measures (normalized signed measures) in measure theory. They have applications in many fields, especially in phase-space descriptions of quantum mechanics. The Margenau-Hill quasiprobability distribution is a real-valued generalization of the classical joint probability distribution, obtained by taking the real part of the complex-valued Kirkwood–Dirac quasiprobability distribution:
$$Q_{\rm MH}(a,b)=\operatorname{Re}( \langle a|\psi\rangle \langle \psi|b\rangle \langle b|a\rangle) = \operatorname{Re} Q_{\rm KD} (a,b),$$
where $|\psi\rangle$ is a quantum state that describe the status of a quantum system, and $|a\rangle$ and $|b\rangle$ are two normalized vectors corresponding to the projective measurement $\Pi_a=|a\rangle \langle a|, \Pi_b=|b\rangle \langle b|$. It is real-valued and can take negative values, and it is called a quasiprobability distribution because it is normalized; that is,
$$\sum_{a,b}Q_{\rm MH}(a,b)=1.$$
The marginals gives correct quantum-mechanical probabilities

$p(a)=\langle \psi|\Pi_a|\psi\rangle = \sum_b Q_{\rm MH}(a,b),$ $p(b)=\langle \psi| \Pi_b|\psi\rangle=\sum_a Q_{\rm MH}(a,b)$

for measuring $\Pi_a$ and $\Pi_b$ over state $|\psi\rangle$. This can be derived from the fact that $\sum_{a,b}Q_{\rm KD}(a,b)=1$ and that the Kirkwood–Dirac quasiprobability distribution gives correct marginals. This means that the Margenau–Hill quasiprobability distribution can be regarded as a phase-space representation of the quantum state, similar to the Wigner function.

For a mixed state $\rho$ (positive-semidefinite and trace-one operator) that describes the status of an open quantum system, the definition can be extended as
$$Q_{\rm MH}(a,b,\cdots,c)=\operatorname{Re} Q_{\rm KD}(a,b,\cdots,c) =\operatorname{Re} \operatorname{Tr}(\rho \Pi_a \Pi_b \cdots \Pi_c),$$
where $\Pi_a=|a\rangle \langle a|,$ $\Pi_b=|b\rangle \langle b|,$ $\cdots$, $\Pi_c=|c\rangle \langle c|$ are projective measurements.

The ability to take negative values is often seen as a mathematical indicator of the "non-classical" nature of the system it describes, reflecting phenomena like the Heisenberg uncertainty principle.

== See also ==
- Wigner quasiprobability distribution
- Kirkwood–Dirac quasiprobability distribution
- Glauber–Sudarshan P representation
- Husimi Q representation
- Phase space formulation
- Negative probability
- Signed measure
- Generalized probabilistic theory
