= GPT =

GPT may refer to:

== Computing ==
- Generative pre-trained transformer, a type of large language model that is widely used in generative AI chatbots
  - GPT (OpenAI model), a series of large language models developed by OpenAI
  - ChatGPT, a generative AI chatbot developed by OpenAI
  - GPT-J, an open-source large language model developed by EleutherAI
- GUID Partition Table, a computer data storage partitioning standard

== Biology ==
- Alanine transaminase, or glutamate pyruvate transaminase, a mammalian protein
- Goniopora toxin, a polypeptide toxin
- UDP-N-acetylglucosamine—undecaprenyl-phosphate N-acetylglucosaminephosphotransferase, a class of enzymes
- Guanosine Triphosphate, a critical cellular peptide

== Companies ==
- GEC Plessey Telecommunications, a defunct British telecommunications manufacturer
- GPT Group, an Australian property investment company
- GPT, a subsidiary of Airbus

== Other uses ==
- General-purpose technology, in economics
- Generalized probabilistic theory, a framework to describe the features of physical theories
- Grounded practical theory, a social science theory
- "GPT", a song on the album ...l, by the Korean girl group STAYC
- Hack-GPT, a fictional AI chatbot that appears in The Simpsons episode, Bart's Birthday
- Gulfport–Biloxi International Airport, US (IATA code: GPT)
