= Wigner distribution =

Wigner distribution or Wigner function may refer to:

- Wigner quasiprobability distribution (what is most commonly intended by term "Wigner function"): a quasiprobability distribution used in quantum physics, also known at the Wigner-Ville distribution
- Wigner distribution function, used in signal processing, which is the time-frequency variant of the Wigner quasiprobability distribution
- Modified Wigner distribution function, used in signal processing
- Wigner semicircle distribution, a probability function used in mathematics

== See also ==
- Breit–Wigner distribution (disambiguation)
- Wigner D-matrix, an irreducible representation of the rotation group SO(3)
