= Eugene Wigner =

Hungarian-American physicist and mathematician (1902–1995)

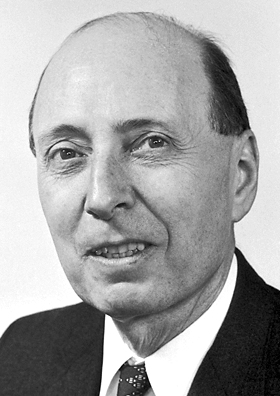
- Wigner in 1963
- Born: Wigner Jenő Pál; November 17, 1902; Budapest, Austria-Hungary
- Died: January 1, 1995 (aged 92); Princeton, New Jersey, U.S.
- Citizenship: Hungary (by birth); United States (naturalized 1937)
- Education: Budapest University of Technology and Economics; Technische Universität Berlin
- Known for: Bargmann–Wigner equations; Law of conservation of parity; Wigner D-matrix; Wigner–Eckart theorem; Wigner's friend; Wigner semicircle distribution; Wigner's classification; Wigner distribution function; Wigner quasiprobability distribution; Wigner crystal; Wigner effect; Wigner energy; Relativistic Breit–Wigner distribution; Modified Wigner distribution function; Wigner–d'Espagnat inequality; Gabor–Wigner transform; Wigner's theorem; Jordan–Wigner transformation; Newton–Wigner localization; Wigner–Inonu contraction; Wigner–Seitz cell; Wigner–Seitz radius; Thomas–Wigner rotation; Wigner–Weyl transform; Wigner–Wilkins spectrum; Way–Wigner formula; 6-j symbol; 9-j symbol; Consciousness causes collapse
- Spouses: Amelia Frank (m. 1936; died 1937) Mary Annette Wheeler (m. 1941; died 1977) Eileen Clare-Patton Hamilton (m. 1979)
- Children: David Wigner, Martha Wigner
- Awards: Medal for Merit (1946); Franklin Medal (1950); Enrico Fermi Award (1958); Atoms for Peace Award (1959); Max Planck Medal (1961); Nobel Prize in Physics (1963); National Medal of Science (1969); Albert Einstein Award (1972); Wigner Medal (1978)
- Scientific career
- Fields: Mathematical physics; Theoretical physics; Atomic physics; Nuclear physics; Solid-state physics; Chemical engineering
- Workplaces: University of Göttingen; University of Wisconsin–Madison; Princeton University; Manhattan Project; University of Chicago
- Thesis: Bildung und Zerfall von Molekülen (1925)
- Doctoral advisor: Michael Polanyi
- Other academic advisors: László Rátz; Richard Becker
- Doctoral students: John Bardeen; Victor Frederick Weisskopf; Marcos Moshinsky; Abner Shimony; Edwin Thompson Jaynes; Frederick Seitz; Conyers Herring; Frederick Tappert; J. O. Hirschfelder; Erdal İnönü; George Snow

Eugene Paul Wigner (Hungarian: Wigner Jenő Pál, pronounced [ˈviɡnɛr ˈjɛnøː ˈpaːl]; November 17, 1902 – January 1, 1995) was a Hungarian-American theoretical physicist and chemical engineer who contributed to mathematical physics. He received the Nobel Prize in Physics in 1963 "for his contributions to the theory of the atomic nucleus and the elementary particles, particularly through the discovery and application of fundamental symmetry principles".

A graduate of the Technical Hochschule Berlin (now Technische Universität Berlin), Wigner worked as an assistant to Karl Weissenberg and Richard Becker at the Kaiser Wilhelm Institute in Berlin, and David Hilbert at the University of Göttingen. Wigner and Hermann Weyl were responsible for introducing group theory into physics, particularly the theory of symmetry in physics. Along the way he performed ground-breaking work in pure mathematics, in which he authored a number of mathematical theorems. In particular, Wigner's theorem is a cornerstone in the mathematical formulation of quantum mechanics. He is also known for his research into the structure of the atomic nucleus. In 1930, Princeton University recruited Wigner, along with John von Neumann, and he moved to the United States, where he obtained citizenship in 1937.

Wigner participated in a meeting with Leo Szilard and Albert Einstein that resulted in the Einstein–Szilard letter, which prompted President Franklin D. Roosevelt to authorize the creation of the Advisory Committee on Uranium with the purpose of investigating the feasibility of nuclear weapons. Wigner was afraid that the German nuclear weapon project would develop an atomic bomb first. During the Manhattan Project, he led a team whose task was to design nuclear reactors to convert uranium into weapons grade plutonium. At the time, reactors existed only on paper, and no reactor had yet gone critical. Wigner was disappointed that DuPont was given responsibility for the detailed design of the reactors, not just their construction. He became director of research and development at the Clinton Laboratory (now the Oak Ridge National Laboratory) in early 1946, but became frustrated with bureaucratic interference by the Atomic Energy Commission, and returned to Princeton.

In the postwar period, he served on government bodies, including the National Bureau of Standards from 1947 to 1951, the mathematics panel of the National Research Council from 1951 to 1954, the physics panel of the National Science Foundation, and the influential General Advisory Committee of the Atomic Energy Commission from 1952 to 1957 and again from 1959 to 1964. In later life, he became more philosophical, and published "The Unreasonable Effectiveness of Mathematics in the Natural Sciences", his best-known work outside technical mathematics and physics.

== Early life and education ==
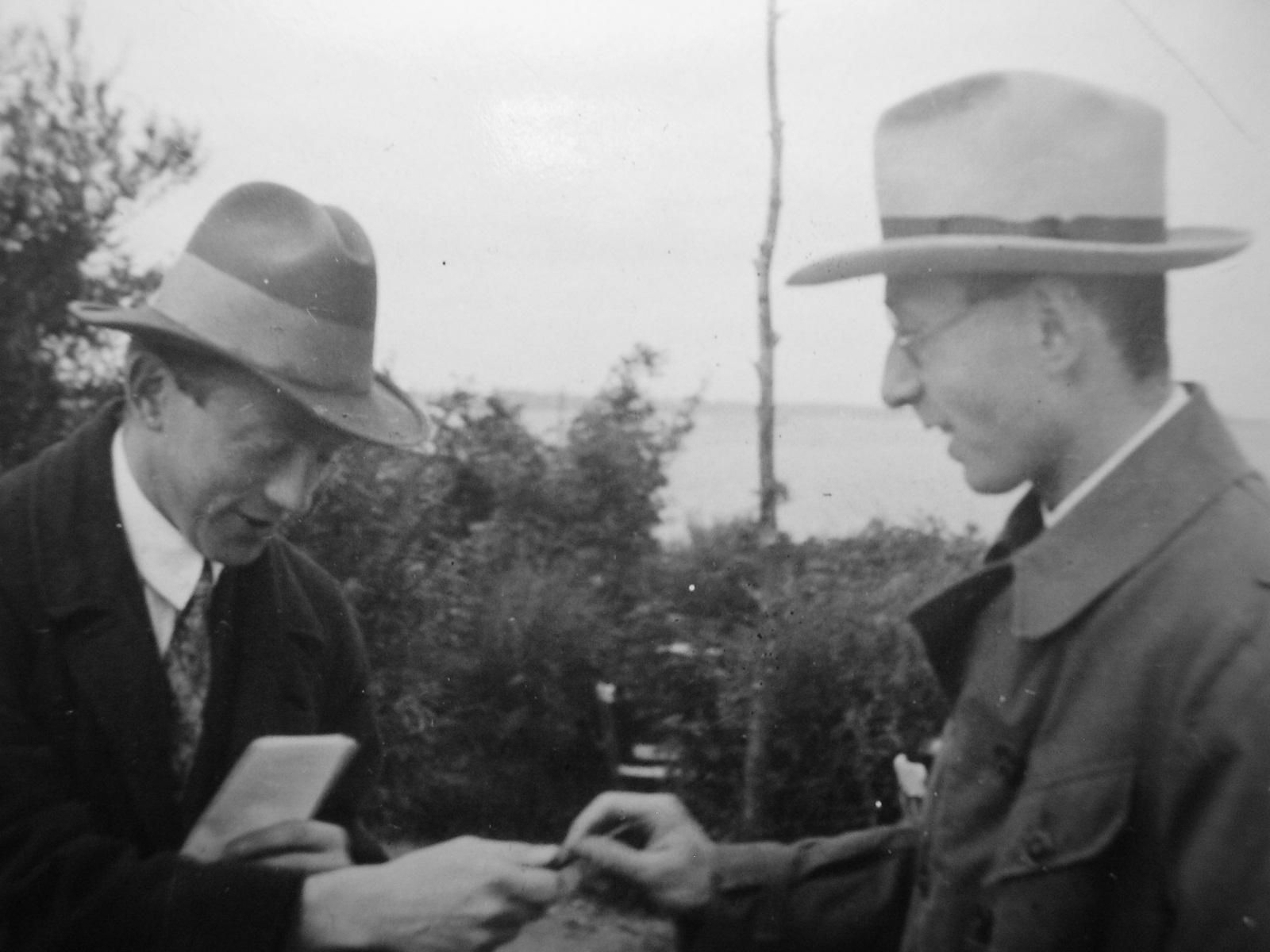
Werner Heisenberg and Eugene Wigner (1928)

Wigner Jenő Pál was born in Budapest, Austria-Hungary on November 17, 1902, to middle class Jewish parents, Elisabeth Elsa Einhorn and Antal Anton Wigner, a leather tanner. He had an elder sister, Berta, known as Biri, and a younger sister Margit, known as Manci, who later married British theoretical physicist Paul Dirac. He was home schooled by a professional teacher until the age of nine, when he started school at the third grade. During this period, Wigner developed an interest in mathematical problems. At the age of 11, Wigner contracted what his doctors believed to be tuberculosis. His parents sent him to live for six weeks in a sanatorium in the Austrian mountains, before the doctors concluded that the diagnosis was mistaken.

Wigner's family was Jewish, but not religiously observant, and his Bar Mitzvah was a secular one. From 1915 through 1919, he studied at the secondary grammar school called Fasori Evangélikus Gimnázium, the school his father had attended. Religious education was compulsory, and he attended classes in Judaism taught by a rabbi. A fellow student was János von Neumann, who was a year behind Wigner. They both benefited from the instruction of the noted mathematics teacher László Rátz. In 1919, to escape the Béla Kun communist regime, the Wigner family briefly fled to Austria, returning to Hungary after Kun's downfall. Partly as a reaction to the prominence of Jews in the Kun regime, the family converted to Lutheranism. Wigner explained later in his life that his family decision to convert to Lutheranism "was not at heart a religious decision but an anti-communist one".

After graduating from the secondary school in 1920, Wigner enrolled at the Budapest University of Technical Sciences, known as the Műegyetem. He was not happy with the courses on offer, and in 1921 enrolled at the Technische Hochschule Berlin (now Technische Universität Berlin), where he studied chemical engineering. He also attended the Wednesday afternoon colloquia of the German Physical Society. These colloquia featured leading researchers including Max Planck, Max von Laue, Rudolf Ladenburg, Werner Heisenberg, Walther Nernst, Wolfgang Pauli, and Albert Einstein. Wigner also met the physicist Leó Szilárd, who at once became Wigner's closest friend. A third experience in Berlin was formative. Wigner worked at the Kaiser Wilhelm Institute for Physical Chemistry and Electrochemistry (now the Fritz Haber Institute), and there he met Michael Polanyi, who became, after Rátz, Wigner's greatest teacher. Polanyi supervised Wigner's DSc thesis, Bildung und Zerfall von Molekülen ("Formation and Decay of Molecules").

== Middle years ==
Wigner returned to Budapest, where he went to work at his father's tannery, but in 1926, he accepted an offer from Karl Weissenberg at the Kaiser Wilhelm Institute in Berlin. Weissenberg wanted someone to assist him with his work on X-ray crystallography, and Polanyi had recommended Wigner. After six months as Weissenberg's assistant, Wigner went to work for Richard Becker for two semesters. Wigner explored quantum mechanics, studying the work of Erwin Schrödinger. He also delved into the group theory of Ferdinand Frobenius and Eduard Ritter von Weber.

Wigner received a request from Arnold Sommerfeld to work at the University of Göttingen as an assistant to the great mathematician David Hilbert. This proved a disappointment, as the aged Hilbert's abilities were failing, and his interests had shifted to logic. Wigner nonetheless studied independently. He laid the foundation for the theory of symmetries in quantum mechanics and in 1927 introduced what is now known as the Wigner D-matrix. Wigner and Hermann Weyl were responsible for introducing group theory into quantum mechanics. The latter had written a standard text, Group Theory and Quantum Mechanics (1928), but it was not easy to understand, especially for younger physicists. Wigner's Group Theory and Its Application to the Quantum Mechanics of Atomic Spectra (1931) made group theory accessible to a wider audience.

Jucys diagram for the Wigner 6-j symbol. The plus sign on the nodes indicates an anticlockwise reading of its surrounding lines. Due to its symmetries, there are many ways in which the diagram can be drawn. An equivalent configuration can be created by taking its mirror image and thus changing the pluses to minuses.

In these works, Wigner laid the foundation for the theory of symmetries in quantum mechanics. Wigner's theorem, which he proved in 1931, is a cornerstone of the mathematical formulation of quantum mechanics. The theorem specifies how physical symmetries such as rotations, translations, and CPT symmetry are represented on the Hilbert space of states. According to the theorem, any symmetry transformation is represented by a linear and unitary or antilinear and antiunitary transformation of Hilbert space. The representation of a symmetry group on a Hilbert space is either an ordinary representation or a projective representation.

In the late 1930s, Wigner extended his research into atomic nuclei. By 1929, his papers were drawing notice in the world of physics. In 1930, Princeton University recruited Wigner for a one-year lectureship, at 7 times the salary that he had been drawing in Europe. Princeton recruited von Neumann at the same time. Jenő Pál Wigner and János von Neumann had collaborated on three papers together in 1928 and two in 1929. They anglicized their first names to "Eugene" and "John", respectively. When their year was up, Princeton offered a five-year contract as visiting professors for half the year. The Technische Hochschule responded with a teaching assignment for the other half of the year. This was very timely, since the Nazis soon rose to power in Germany. At Princeton in 1934, Wigner introduced his sister Margit "Manci" Wigner to the physicist Paul Dirac, with whom she remarried.

Princeton did not rehire Wigner when his contract ran out in 1936. Through Gregory Breit, Wigner found new employment at the University of Wisconsin. There, he met his first wife, Amelia Frank, who was a physicist there. However, she died unexpectedly in 1937, leaving Wigner distraught. He therefore accepted an offer in 1938 from Princeton to return there. Wigner became a naturalized citizen of the United States on January 8, 1937, and he brought his parents to the United States.

== Manhattan Project ==
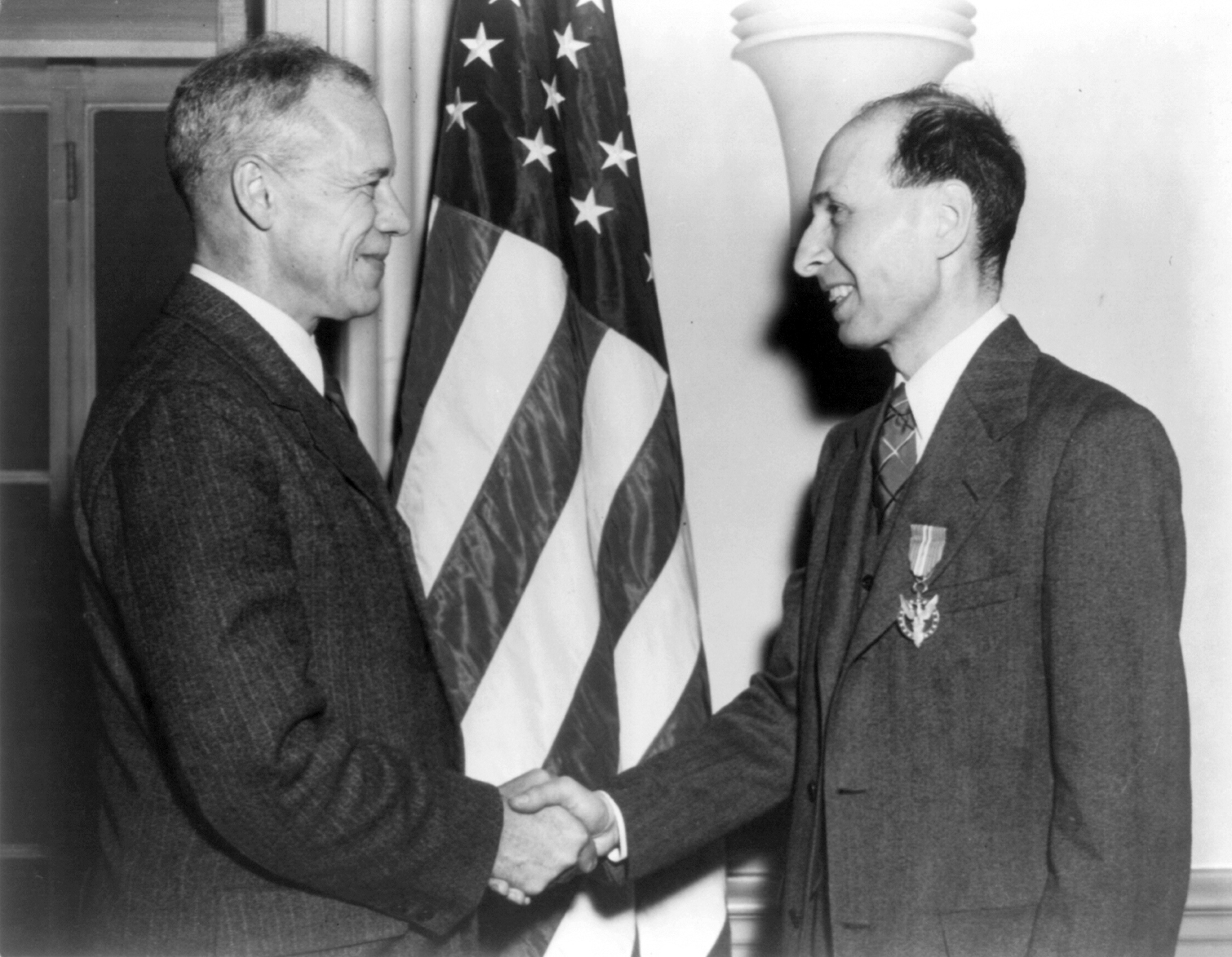
Wigner receiving the Medal for Merit for his work on the Manhattan Project from Robert P. Patterson (left), March 5, 1946

Although he was a professed political amateur, on August 2, 1939, he participated in a meeting with Leó Szilárd and Albert Einstein that resulted in the Einstein–Szilárd letter, which prompted President Franklin D. Roosevelt to authorize the creation of the Advisory Committee on Uranium with the purpose of investigating the feasibility of atomic bombs. Wigner was afraid that the German nuclear weapon project would develop an atomic bomb first, and even refused to have his fingerprints taken because they could be used to track him down if Germany won. "Thoughts of being murdered," he later recalled, "focus your mind wonderfully."

On June 4, 1941, Wigner married his second wife, Mary Annette Wheeler, a professor of physics at Vassar College, who had completed her Ph.D. at Yale University in 1932. After the war she taught physics on the faculty of Rutgers University's Douglass College in New Jersey until her retirement in 1964. They remained married until her death in November 1977. They had two children, David Wigner and Martha Wigner Upton.

During the Manhattan Project, Wigner led a team that included J. Ernest Wilkins Jr., Alvin M. Weinberg, Katharine Way, Gale Young and Edward Creutz. The group's task was to design the production nuclear reactors that would convert uranium into weapons grade plutonium. At the time, reactors existed only on paper, and no reactor had yet gone critical. In July 1942, Wigner chose a conservative 100 MW design, with a graphite neutron moderator and water cooling. Wigner was present at a converted rackets court under the stands at the University of Chicago's abandoned Stagg Field on December 2, 1942, when the world's first atomic reactor, Chicago Pile One (CP-1) achieved a controlled nuclear chain reaction.

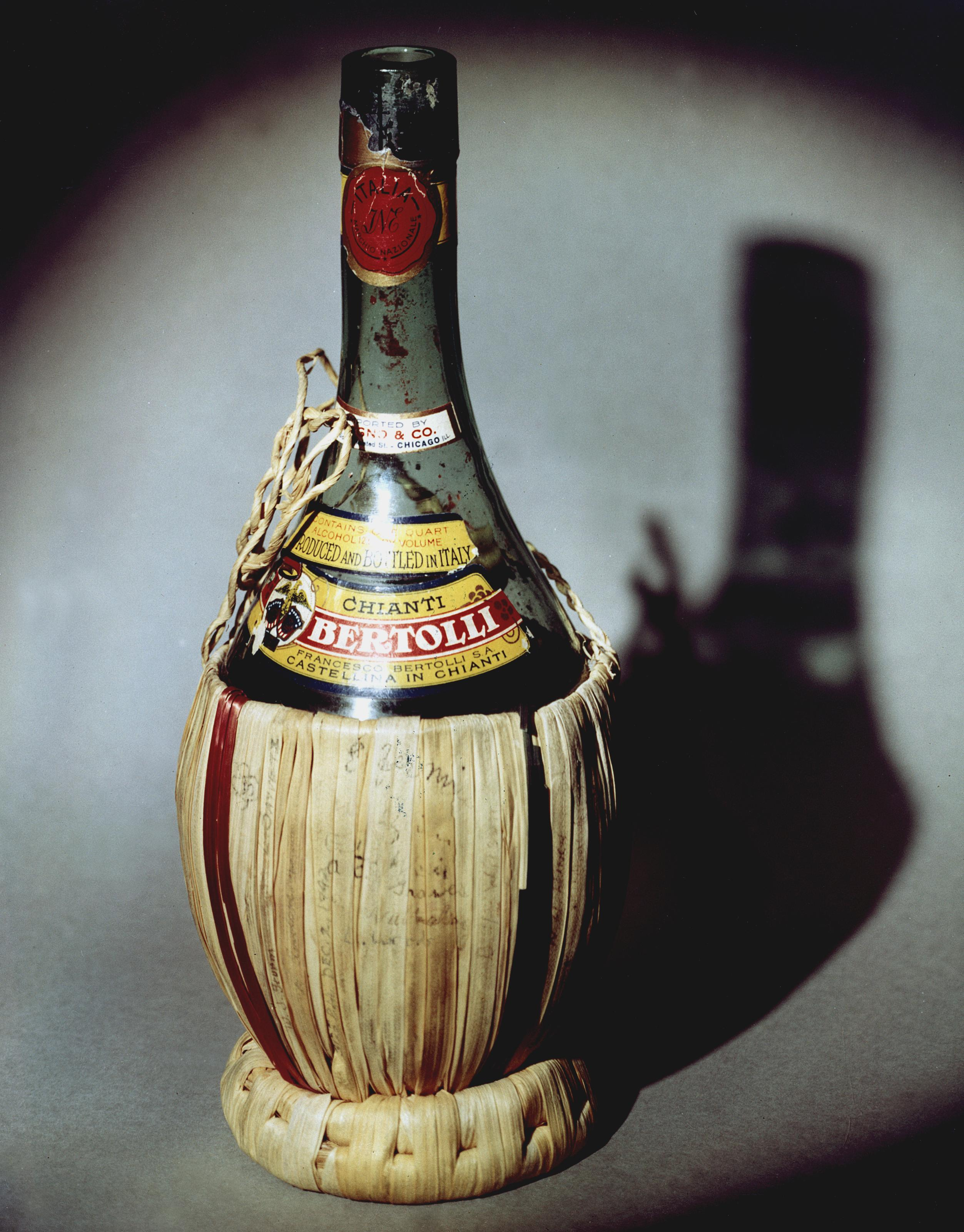
The Chianti fiasco purchased by Wigner to help celebrate the first self-sustaining, controlled chain reaction. It was signed by the participants.

Wigner was disappointed that DuPont was given responsibility for the detailed design of the reactors, not just their construction. He threatened to resign in February 1943, but was talked out of it by the head of the Metallurgical Laboratory, Arthur Compton, who sent him on vacation instead. As it turned out, a design decision by DuPont to give the reactor additional load tubes for more uranium saved the project when neutron poisoning became a problem. Without the additional tubes, the reactor could have been run at 35% power until the boron impurities in the graphite were burned up and enough plutonium produced to run the reactor at full power; but this would have set the project back a year. During the 1950s, he would even work for DuPont on the Savannah River Site. Wigner did not regret working on the bomb, remarking:

In fact, my regret is that it was not done sooner. If we had begun trying seriously to control fission in 1939, we might have had an atomic bomb by the Winter of 1943-1944. At that time Stalin's army was still bottled up in Stalingrad. By the middle of 1945, when we first used the bomb, they had already overrun much of Central Europe. The Yalta Conference would have produced a document much less favourable to Russia, and even Communist China might have been set back. So I do not regret helping to build the bomb.

An important discovery Wigner made during the project was the Wigner effect. This is a swelling of the graphite moderator caused by the displacement of atoms by neutron radiation. The Wigner effect was a serious problem for the reactors at the Hanford Site in the immediate post-war period, and resulted in production cutbacks and a reactor being shut down entirely. It was eventually discovered that it could be overcome by controlled heating and annealing.

Through Manhattan project funding, Wigner and Leonard Eisenbud also developed an important general approach to nuclear reactions, the Wigner–Eisenbud R-matrix theory, which was published in 1947.

== Later years ==
Wigner was elected to the American Philosophical Society in 1944 and the United States National Academy of Sciences in 1945. He accepted a position as the director of research and development at the Clinton Laboratory (now the Oak Ridge National Laboratory) in Oak Ridge, Tennessee in early 1946. Because he did not want to be involved in administrative duties, he became co-director of the laboratory, with James Lum handling the administrative chores as executive director. When the newly created Atomic Energy Commission (AEC) took charge of the laboratory's operations at the start of 1947, Wigner feared that many of the technical decisions would be made in Washington. He also saw the Army's continuation of wartime security policies at the laboratory as a "meddlesome oversight", interfering with research. One such incident occurred in March 1947, when the AEC discovered that Wigner's scientists were conducting experiments with a critical mass of uranium-235 when the director of the Manhattan Project, Major General Leslie R. Groves, Jr., had forbidden such experiments in August 1946 after the death of Louis Slotin at the Los Alamos Laboratory. Wigner argued that Groves's order had been superseded, but was forced to terminate the experiments, which were completely different from the one that killed Slotin.

Feeling unsuited to a managerial role in such an environment, he left Oak Ridge in 1947 and returned to Princeton University, although he maintained a consulting role with the facility for many years. In the postwar period, he served on a number of government bodies, including the National Bureau of Standards from 1947 to 1951, the mathematics panel of the National Research Council from 1951 to 1954, the physics panel of the National Science Foundation, and the influential General Advisory Committee of the Atomic Energy Commission from 1952 to 1957 and again from 1959 to 1964. He also contributed to civil defense.

Wigner was elected to the American Academy of Arts and Sciences in 1950.

Near the end of his life, Wigner's thoughts turned more philosophical. In 1960, he published a now classic article on the philosophy of mathematics and of physics, which has become his best-known work outside technical mathematics and physics, "The Unreasonable Effectiveness of Mathematics in the Natural Sciences". He argued that biology and cognition could be the origin of physical concepts, as we humans perceive them, and that the happy coincidence that mathematics and physics were so well matched, seemed to be "unreasonable" and hard to explain. His original paper has provoked and inspired many responses across a wide range of disciplines. These included Richard Hamming in Computer Science, Arthur Lesk in Molecular Biology, Peter Norvig in data mining, Max Tegmark in Physics, Ivor Grattan-Guinness in Mathematics, and Vela Velupillai in Economics.

Turning to philosophical questions about the theory of quantum mechanics, Wigner developed a thought experiment (later called Wigner's Friend paradox) to illustrate his belief that consciousness is foundational to the quantum mechanical measurement process. He thereby followed an ontological approach that sets human's consciousness at the center: "All that quantum mechanics purports to provide are probability connections between subsequent impressions (also called 'apperceptions') of the consciousness".

Measurements are understood as the interactions which create the impressions in our consciousness (and as a result modify the wave function of the "measured" physical system), an idea which has been called the "consciousness causes collapse" interpretation.

Hugh Everett III (a student of Wigner's) discussed Wigner's thought experiment in the introductory part of his 1957 dissertation as an "amusing, but extremely hypothetical drama". In an early draft of Everett's work, one also finds a drawing of the Wigner's Friend situation, which must be seen as the first evidence on paper of the thought experiment that was later assigned to be Wigner's. This suggests that Everett must at least have discussed the problem together with Wigner.

In November 1963, Wigner called for the allocation of 10% of the national defense budget to be spent on nuclear blast shelters and survival resources, arguing that such an expenditure would be less costly than disarmament. Wigner considered a recent Woods Hole study's conclusion that a nuclear strike would kill 20% of Americans to be a very modest projection and that the country could recover from such an attack more quickly than Germany had recovered from the devastation of World War II.

Wigner was awarded the Nobel Prize in Physics in 1963 "for his contributions to the theory of the atomic nucleus and the elementary particles, particularly through the discovery and application of fundamental symmetry principles". The prize was shared that year, with the other half of the award divided between Maria Goeppert-Mayer and J. Hans D. Jensen. Wigner professed that he had never considered the possibility that this might occur, and added: "I never expected to get my name in the newspapers without doing something wicked." He also won the Franklin Medal in 1950, the Enrico Fermi award in 1958, the Atoms for Peace Award in 1959, the Max Planck Medal in 1961, the National Medal of Science in 1969, the Albert Einstein Award in 1972, the Golden Plate Award of the American Academy of Achievement in 1974, the eponymous Wigner Medal in 1978, and the Herzl Prize in 1982. In 1968 he gave the Josiah Willard Gibbs lecture.

After his retirement from Princeton in 1971, Wigner prepared the first edition of Symmetries and Reflections, a collection of philosophical essays, and became more involved in international and political meetings; around this time he became a leader and vocal defender of the Unification Church's annual International Conference on the Unity of the Sciences.

Mary died in November 1977. In 1979, Wigner married his third wife, Eileen Clare-Patton (Pat) Hamilton (1915–2010), the widow of physicist Donald Ross Hamilton, the dean of the graduate school at Princeton University, who had died in 1972. In 1992, at the age of 90, he published his memoirs, The Recollections of Eugene P. Wigner with Andrew Szanton. In it, Wigner said: "The full meaning of life, the collective meaning of all human desires, is fundamentally a mystery beyond our grasp. As a young man, I chafed at this state of affairs. But by now I have made peace with it. I even feel a certain honor to be associated with such a mystery." In his collection of essays 'Philosophical Reflections and Syntheses' (1995), he commented: "It was not possible to formulate the laws of quantum mechanics in a fully consistent way without reference to consciousness."

Wigner was credited as a member of the advisory board for the Western Goals Foundation, a private domestic intelligence agency created in the US in 1979 to "fill the critical gap caused by the crippling of the FBI, the disabling of the House Un-American Activities Committee and the destruction of crucial government files".

Wigner died of pneumonia at the University Medical Center in Princeton, New Jersey on January 1, 1995.

== Publications ==
- 1958 (with Alvin M. Weinberg). Physical Theory of Neutron Chain Reactors University of Chicago Press. ISBN 0-226-88517-8
- 1959. Group Theory and its Application to the Quantum Mechanics of Atomic Spectra. New York: Academic Press. Translation by J. J. Griffin of 1931, Gruppentheorie und ihre Anwendungen auf die Quantenmechanik der Atomspektren, Vieweg Verlag, Braunschweig.
- 1960 "The Unreasonable Effectiveness of Mathematics in the Natural Sciences"
- 1970 Symmetries and Reflections: Scientific Essays. Indiana University Press, Bloomington ISBN 0-262-73021-9
- 1992 (as told to Andrew Szanton). The Recollections of Eugene P. Wigner. Plenum. ISBN 0-306-44326-0
- 1995 (with Jagdish Mehra and Arthur Wightman, eds.). Philosophical Reflections and Syntheses. Springer, Berlin ISBN 3-540-63372-3

== See also ==
- List of Jewish Nobel laureates
- List of things named after Eugene Wigner
- The Martians (scientists)

=== Selected contributions ===
Theoretical physics

- Bargmann–Wigner equations
- Jordan–Wigner transformation
- Newton–Wigner localization
- Polynomial Wigner–Ville distribution
- Relativistic Breit–Wigner distribution
- Thomas–Wigner rotation
- Wigner crystal
- Wigner D-matrix
- Wigner effect
- Wigner energy
- Wigner lattice
- Wigner quasiprobability distribution
- Wigner's classification
- Wigner's disease
- Wigner's friend
- Wigner's theorem
- Wigner–Eckart theorem
- Wigner–Inonu contraction
- Wigner–Seitz cell
- Wigner–Seitz radius
- Wigner–Weyl transform
- Wigner–Wilkins spectrum
- Wigner–Witmer correlation rules

Mathematics

- 6-j symbol
- 9-j symbol
- Gabor–Wigner transform
- Modified Wigner distribution function
- Wigner 3-j symbols
- Wigner distribution function
- Wigner–İnönü group contraction
- Wigner quasiprobability distribution
- Wigner rotation
- Wigner semicircle distribution
- Wigner surmise
