= G. Faye Boudreaux-Bartels =

American electrical engineer

Gloria Faye Boudreaux-Bartels is an American electrical engineer known for her work on signal processing, including time–frequency representation, wavelet transforms, and the Wigner distribution function. She is a professor emerita of electrical, computer and biomedical engineering at the University of Rhode Island.

== Education and career ==
Boudreaux-Bartels is a 1976 graduate of the University of Southwestern Louisiana. She earned a master's degree at Rice University in 1980, and completed her PhD at Rice in 1984. Her dissertation was Time-Frequency Signal Processing Algorithms: Analysis and Synthesis Using Wigner Distributions.

She was a researcher for Shell Oil and a Fulbright Scholar at Télécom Paris before joining the University of Rhode Island faculty in 1984. She was the first woman on the faculty of the Department of Electrical, Computer and Biomedical Engineering, and later became its chair.

== Recognition ==
Boudreaux-Bartels was named a Fellow of the IEEE in 1998, "for contributions to time-frequency signal representations and their applications".

The University of Rhode Island gave Boudreaux-Bartels the URI Diversity Award in Faculty Excellence and the URI Association for Professional and Academic Women Woman of the Year award in 2000. In 2019 it gave her its Sheila Black Grubman Faculty Outstanding Service Award.
