= Amelia Frank =

American physicist (1906–1937)

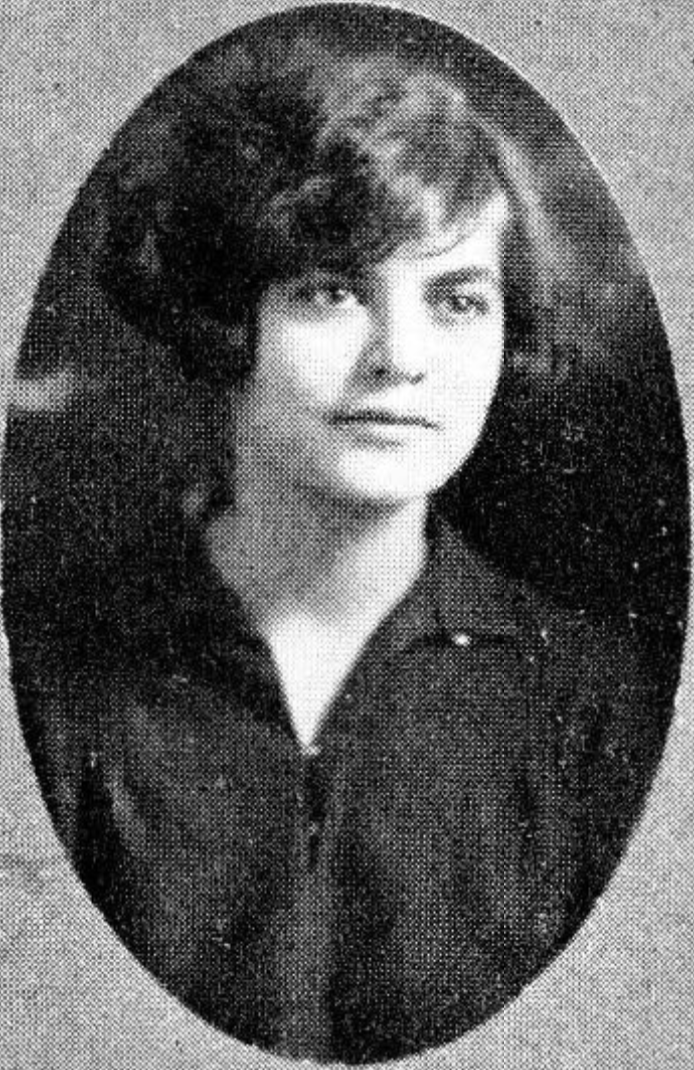
- Born: March 4, 1906; Marion, Ohio, US
- Died: August 16, 1937 (aged 31); Adrian, Michigan, US
- Resting place: Toledo, Ohio
- Education: Goucher College; University of Wisconsin–Madison
- Spouse: Eugene Wigner
- Scientific career
- Fields: Physics (Quantum Mechanics)
- Workplaces: University of Wisconsin–Madison
- Thesis: Temperature Variation of the Magnetic Susceptibility, Gyromagnetic Ratio, and Heat Capacity in Sm^{+++} and Eu^{+++} (1935)
- Doctoral advisor: John H. Van Vleck

Amelia Zipora Frank (March 4, 1906 – August 16, 1937) was an American physicist known for her work in the quantum mechanics of magnetism. Working with physicist John Van Vleck, she studied the magnetic behavior of rare earth elements. She was married to Eugene Wigner, a Nobel laureate in Physics. Unable to secure an academic position, she left physics before dying at 31.

== Education and career ==
Frank attended Goucher College for her undergraduate education, graduating in 1928. She was a member of Phi Beta Kappa, played on the hockey and baseball teams, and was a member of the Physics Club. She attended the University of Wisconsin–Madison for her graduate studies. For the 1930–1931 school year, she was Harriet Remington Laird Fellow in Physics. Her PhD was supervised by John van Vleck and examined the quantum mechanics of magnetism. Frank received her PhD by 1935.

After graduating, Frank worked as a tutor at Wisconsin–Madison and continued her research in crystal field theory with van Vleck. In 1935, during the Great Depression and supporting her younger sister, she had to take jobs typing and cooking. She ultimately resigned from the University of Wisconsin–Madison in October 1936 after sparking up a romantic relationship with her colleague, theoretical physicist Eugene Wigner.

== Research ==
Frank studied quantum mechanics, specifically in magnetism. She focused on rare earth elements, whose strong magnetic properties could not be explained by then-existing theories. Frank extended previous theories using group theory, recently introduced to physics by Eugene Wigner, and explored the breakdown from cubic to rhombic symmetry. She has been referred to as a pioneer of crystal field theory.

Her thesis, Temperature Variation of the Magnetic Susceptibility, Gyromagnetic Ratio, and Heat Capacity in Sm^{+++} and Eu^{+++}, showed that quantum corrections were necessary to explain the experimental behavior of samarium. More than forty years later, van Vleck would cite her thesis in his Nobel lecture on quantum mechanics in magnetism, as well as including a plot from her thesis.

== Personal life ==
Frank was born in 1906 in Marion, Ohio, to Anna and Louis Frank, a Lithuanian couple who owned a junkyard. While a student, she was flatmates with Mary Bunting. She was Jewish, though not very observant.

Frank left her position at the University of Wisconsin–Madison to pursue a relationship with Eugene Wigner. The pair married on December 23, 1936. Frank fell ill from an unknown cause only a few weeks after the wedding. Wigner stated it was heart disease, though other sources, including her death certificate, state it was cancer. After several months in a hospital, she returned to her parents' house in Michigan, where she died in August 1937.

== Legacy ==
During the 20th century, Frank was primarily remembered for her relationship with Wigner, especially her premature death, which was a primary cause for his move from Wisconsin–Madison to Princeton. In the 21st century, articles in The Conversation and Journal of Alloys and Compounds have discussed more of her own contributions to crystal field theory and described her as "under-recognised" and an "unsung heroine."

== Selected publications ==
- Van Vleck, J.H.; Frank, Amelia (1929). "The Mean Square Angular Momentum and Diamagnetism of the Normal Hydrogen Molecule". Proceedings of the National Academy of Sciences. 15 (7): 539–544.
- Van Vleck, J.H.; Frank, A. (1929). "The Effect of Second Order Zeeman Terms on Magnetic Susceptibilities in the Rare Earth and Iron Groups". Physical Review. 34 (11): 1494–1496. doi:10.1103/PhysRev.34.1494.
- Frank, Amelia (1932). "Temperature Variation of the Magnetic Susceptibility, Gyromagnetic Ratio, and Heat Capacity in Sm + + + and Eu + + +". Physical Review. 39 (1): 119–129. doi:10.1103/PhysRev.39.119.
- Frank, Amelia (1935). "The Effect of Crystalline Fields on the Magnetic Susceptibilities of Sm + + + and Eu + + + , and the Heat Capacity of Sm + + +". Physical Review. 48 (9): 765–771. doi:10.1103/PhysRev.48.765.
- Albertson, Walter (1936). "Analysis of the Spectrum of Singly Ionized Samarium". The Astrophysical Journal. 84: 26. doi:10.1086/143749.
  - Although she is not credited as an author, Frank is credited in the text for calculations done for this publication.
