= Kirkwood-Dirac quasiprobability =

The Kirkwood–Dirac quasiprobability distribution (often abbreviated KD distribution) is a complex-valued generalization of a classical joint probability distribution. It was first introduced independently by John G. Kirkwood and later by Paul Dirac as an attempt to describe quantum states in phase space using a joint distribution for noncommuting observables (like position and momentum).

It can take complex values and is therefore described as a quasiprobability distribution. Although its marginals yield valid measurement probabilities, the full distribution is generally complex and may assume negative or nonreal values. In this sense, it can be viewed as part of a generalized probabilistic theory that extends classical probability to capture intrinsically quantum features such as coherence and contextuality.

== Definition and meaning ==
The Kirkwood–Dirac quasiprobability distribution $Q_{KD}(a,b)$ of a pure state is defined as
$$Q_{KD}=\langle a|\psi\rangle \langle \psi|b\rangle \langle b|a\rangle.$$
It can take values in the complex field, thus not probability distribution. It is called a quasiprobability distribution because
$$\sum_{a,b}Q_{KD}(a,b)=1.$$
The marginal probability distributions implied by this quasiprobability distribution give correct quantum mechanical probabilities for measuring $\Pi_a$ or $\Pi_b$ over state $|\psi\rangle$, in the sense that
$$\sum_{a} \langle a|\psi\rangle \langle \psi|b\rangle \langle b|a\rangle = \langle b|\psi \rangle \langle \psi | b \rangle \quad\text{and}\quad \sum_{b} \langle a|\psi\rangle \langle \psi|b\rangle \langle b|a\rangle = \langle a|\psi \rangle \langle \psi | a \rangle.$$

For mixed state $\rho$, the definition can be extended as
$$Q_{KD}(a,b,\cdots,c)=\operatorname{Tr}(\rho \Pi_a \Pi_b \cdots \Pi_c).$$
Similar as Wigner quasiprobablity distribution, the Kirkwood–Dirac distribution can be regarded as a phase space description of quantum mechanics.

The Kirkwood–Dirac quasiprobability distributions have found numerous applications in quantum information theory, for example in characterizing quantum contextuality, quantum coherence, and in studies of quantum chaos (through the out-of-time-ordered correlator approach), as well as in Leggett–Garg inequality of macrorealism. In the context of quantum technologies, the Kirkwood–Dirac quasiprobability distribution has also been applied in areas such as quantum metrology, quantum thermodynamics, and related studies of quantum measurement and control.
