= Andrew Szanton =

Andrew Szanton (born 1963 in Washington, D.C.) is an American collaborative memoirist. During his career he has worked with a wide range of subjects including civil rights pioneer Charles Evers, physicists Eugene Wigner and George Pake, former Goldman Sachs executive John Whitehead, former United States Senator Edward Brooke, and former Boston mayor Raymond Flynn.

== Career ==
In 2015, Szanton began working with former New Jersey senator Bill Bradley, conducting interviews for Senator Bradley's oral history.

A successful ghostwriter and memoir coach commonly performs a range of tasks: mastering whatever published material is directly relevant to telling the life story; helping the memoir subject to gather and evaluate family letters, manuscripts and photos; interviewing family, friends, and colleagues; and perhaps most important of all, seeing the essential patterns of the life, and helping the subject eloquently trace those patterns through their life, understanding the ways that certain experiences of childhood and youth can shape the choices of the mature person.

Szanton honed his approach to memoir writing for a number of years as an instructor at the Extension School of Harvard University.

It was through the Smithsonian, as an oral historian on staff, that Szanton first encountered the Hungarian-American Eugene Wigner, a famously modest man who had always resisted entreaties to write his memoirs. Reminded of his own mortality by the raft of old friends and colleagues dying, Dr. Wigner agreed to write his memoir, with Szanton assisting. The result was The Recollections of Eugene P. Wigner. The New York Times wrote a mixed review of the book, describing it as "both entertaining and exasperating reading.

Have No Fear with Charles Evers followed in 1997 and Bridging the Divide with Edward Brooke was published in 2007.

Memoir collaboration was once commonly the work of journalists or academics, working as a sideline. For example, a critic of popular music for a major newsmagazine might be hired to bring material to, and check the accuracy of, the rich but scattered spoken recollections of a pop star. The journalist critic was hired primarily for what he or she knew about the subject area, and for an ability to meet deadlines—not for any particular dedication to, or demonstrated skill at, the memoir form. The books that resulted were advertised as "By (the headliner) "as told to" the collaborator, as though the collaborator were merely a scribe.

Andrew Szanton is a writer who places memoir collaboration at the center of his art, and has few institutional connections. In 2015, he began working with Princeton. Memoir collaborators often bring to their work detailed knowledge from certain fields—Szanton is something of an expert in the early history of atomic weaponry and of the U.S. civil rights movement from 1963 to 1971. But Szanton stakes his claim to co-authorship less on any fund of relevant knowledge than on his mastery of the memoir form.

In 2026, Pulitzer Prize–winning author and longtime New Yorker writer John McPhee devoted part of his autobiographical “Tabula Rasa” series to Szanton, describing him as “a highly skilled writer” and reflecting on his career as a collaborative memoirist. McPhee wrote that Szanton's work helped preserve stories “that otherwise were not going to be told.”
