= Breit–Wigner distribution =

Breit–Wigner distribution may refer to:

- Cauchy distribution, also known as the Lorentz distribution or the (non-relativistic) Breit–Wigner distribution
- Relativistic Breit–Wigner distribution, a continuous probability distribution

== See also ==
- Wigner distribution (disambiguation)
