= Wigner's friend =

Thought experiment in theoretical quantum physics

Wigner's friend is a thought experiment in theoretical quantum physics, first published by the Hungarian-American physicist Eugene Wigner in 1961, and further developed by David Deutsch in 1985. The scenario involves an indirect observation of a quantum measurement: An observer $W$ observes another observer $F$ who performs a quantum measurement on a physical system. The two observers then formulate a statement about the physical system's state after the measurement according to the laws of quantum theory. In the Copenhagen interpretation, the resulting statements of the two observers contradict each other. This reflects a seeming incompatibility of two laws in the Copenhagen interpretation: the deterministic and continuous time evolution of the state of a closed system and the nondeterministic, discontinuous collapse of the state of a system upon measurement. Wigner's friend is therefore directly linked to the measurement problem in quantum mechanics with its famous Schrödinger's cat paradox.

Generalizations and extensions of Wigner's friend have been proposed. Two such scenarios involving multiple friends have been implemented in a laboratory, using photons to stand in for the friends. However, the use of photons as observers has been criticized by quantum physicist Lev Vaidman of Tel Aviv University as "ridiculous; the friend has to be macroscopic". Philosopher of physics Tim Maudlin of New York University says that "Nobody thinks a photon is an observer".

== Original paradox ==
Wigner introduced the thought experiment in a 1961 article "Remarks on the Mind-Body Question". He begins by noting that most physicists in the then-recent past had been thoroughgoing materialists who would insist that "mind" or "soul" are illusory, and that nature is fundamentally deterministic. He argues that quantum physics has changed this situation:

All that quantum mechanics purports to provide are probability connections between subsequent impressions (also called "apperceptions") of the consciousness, and even though the dividing line between the observer, whose consciousness is being affected, and the observed physical object can be shifted towards the one or the other to a considerable degree, it cannot be eliminated.

=== Nature of the wave function ===
Going into more detail, Wigner says:

Given any object, all the possible knowledge concerning that object can be given as its wave function. This is a mathematical concept the exact nature of which need not concern us here—it is composed of a (countable) infinity of numbers. If one knows these numbers, one can foresee the behavior of the object as far as it can be foreseen. More precisely, the wave function permits one to foretell with what probabilities the object will make one or another impression on us if we let it interact with us either directly, or indirectly. [...] In fact, the wave function is only a suitable language for describing the body of knowledge—gained by observations—which is relevant for predicting the future behaviour of the system. For this reason, the interactions which may create one or another sensation in us are also called observations, or measurements. One realises that all the information which the laws of physics provide consists of probability connections between subsequent impressions that a system makes on one if one interacts with it repeatedly, i.e., if one makes repeated measurements on it. The wave function is a convenient summary of that part of the past impressions which remains relevant for the probabilities of receiving the different possible impressions when interacting with the system at later times.

The wave function of an object "exists" (Wigner's quotation marks) because observers can share it:

The information given by the wave function is communicable. If someone else somehow determines the wave function of a system, he can tell me about it and, according to the theory, the probabilities for the possible different impressions (or "sensations") will be equally large, no matter whether he or I interact with the system in a given fashion.

Observing a system causes its wave functions to change indeterministically, because "the entering of an impression into our consciousness" implies a revision of "the probabilities for different impressions which we expect to receive in the future".

=== The observer observed ===
Wigner presents two arguments for the thesis that the mind influences the body, i.e., that a human body can "deviate from the laws of physics" as deduced from experimenting upon inanimate objects. The argument that he personally finds less persuasive is the one that has become known as "Wigner's friend". In this thought experiment, Wigner posits that his friend is in a laboratory, and Wigner lets the friend perform a quantum measurement on a physical system (this could be a spin system). This system is assumed to be in a superposition of two distinct states, say, state 0 and state 1 (or $|0\rangle$ and $|1\rangle$ in Dirac notation). When Wigner's friend measures the system in the {0,1}-basis, according to quantum mechanics, they will get one of the two possible outcomes (0 or 1) and the system will collapse into the corresponding state.

Now Wigner himself models the scenario from outside the laboratory, knowing that inside, his friend will at some point perform the 0/1-measurement on the physical system. According to the linearity of the quantum mechanical equations, Wigner will assign a superposition state to the whole laboratory (i.e. the joint system of the physical system together with the friend): The superposition state of the lab is then a linear combination of "system is in state 0 – friend has measured 0" and "system is in state 1 – friend has measured 1".

Let Wigner now ask his friend for the result of the measurement. Whichever answer the friend gives (0 or 1), Wigner would then assign the state "system is in state 0 – friend has measured 0" or "system is in state 1 – friend has measured 1" to the laboratory. Therefore, it is only at the time when he learns about his friend's result that the superposition state of the laboratory collapses.

However, unless Wigner is considered in a "privileged position as ultimate observer", the friend's point of view must be regarded as equally valid, and this is where an apparent paradox comes into play: From the point of view of the friend, the measurement result was determined long before Wigner had asked about it, and the state of the physical system has already collapsed. When exactly did the collapse occur? Was it when the friend had finished their measurement, or when the information of its result entered Wigner's consciousness? As Wigner says, he could ask his friend, "What did you feel about the [measurement result] before I asked you?" The question of what result the friend has seen is surely "already decided in his mind", Wigner writes, which implies that the friend–system joint state must already be one of the collapsed options, not a superposition of them. Wigner concludes that the linear time evolution of quantum states according to the Schrödinger equation cannot apply when the physical entity involved is a conscious being.

Wigner presents his second argument, which he finds more persuasive, much more briefly:

The second argument to support the existence of an influence of the consciousness on the physical world is based on the observation that we do not know of any phenomenon in which one subject is influenced by another without exerting an influence thereupon. This appears convincing to this writer.

=== As a reductio ad absurdum ===
According to physicist Leslie Ballentine, by 1987 Wigner had decided that consciousness does not cause a physical collapse of the wavefunction, although he still believed that his chain of inferences leading up to that conclusion were correct. As Ballentine recounts, Wigner regarded his 1961 argument as a reductio ad absurdum, indicating that the postulates of quantum mechanics need to be revised in some way.

== Responses in different interpretations of quantum mechanics ==
=== Many-worlds interpretations ===
The various versions of the many worlds interpretation avoid the need to postulate that consciousness causes collapse – indeed, that collapse occurs at all.

Hugh Everett III's doctoral thesis "'Relative state' formulation of quantum mechanics" serves as the foundation for today's many versions of many-worlds interpretations. In the introductory part of his work, Everett discusses the "amusing, but extremely hypothetical drama" of the Wigner's friend paradox. Note that there is evidence of a drawing of the scenario in an early draft of Everett's thesis. It was therefore Everett who provided the first written discussion of the problem four or five years before it was discussed in "Remarks on the mind-body question" by Wigner, of whom it received the name and fame thereafter. However, Everett being a student of Wigner, it is clear that they must have discussed it together at some point.

In contrast to his teacher Wigner, who held the consciousness of an observer to be responsible for a collapse, Everett understands the Wigner's friend scenario in a different way: Insisting that quantum states' assignments should be objective and non-perspectival, Everett derives a straightforward logical contradiction when letting $F$ and $W$ reason about the laboratory's state of $S$ together with $F$. Then, the Wigner's Friend scenario shows to Everett an incompatibility of the collapse postulate for describing measurements with the deterministic evolution of closed systems. In the context of his new theory, Everett claims to solve the Wigner's friend paradox by only allowing a continuous unitary time evolution of the wave function of the universe. However, there is no evidence of any written argument of Everett's on the topic.

In many-worlds interpretations, measurements are modelled as interactions between subsystems of the universe and manifest themselves as a branching of the universal state. The different branches account for the different possible measurement outcomes and are seen to exist as subjective experiences of the corresponding observers. In this view, the friend's measurement of the spin results in a branching of the world into two parallel worlds, one, in which the friend has measured the spin to be 1, and another, in which the friend has received the measurement outcome 0. If then Wigner measures at a later time the combined system of friend and spin system, the world again splits into two parallel parts.

=== Objective-collapse theories ===
According to objective-collapse theories, wave-function collapse occurs when a superposed system reaches a certain objective threshold of size or complexity. Objective-collapse proponents would expect a system as macroscopic as a cat to have collapsed before the box was opened, so the question of observation-of-observers does not arise for them. If the measured system were much simpler (such as a single spin state), then once the observation was made, the system would be expected to collapse, since the larger system of the scientist, equipment, and room would be considered far too complex to become entangled in the superposition.

=== Relational quantum mechanics ===
Relational quantum mechanics (RQM) was developed in 1996 by Carlo Rovelli and is one of the more recent interpretations of quantum mechanics. In RQM, any physical system can play the role of an observing system, to which any other system may display "facts" about physical variables. This inherent relativity of facts in RQM provides a straightforward "solution" to the seemingly paradoxical situation in Wigner's friend scenario: The state that the friend assigns to the spin is a state relative to himself as friend, whereas the state that Wigner assigns to the combined system of friend and spin is a state relative to himself as Wigner. By construction of the theory, these two descriptions do not have to match, because both are correct assignments of states relative to their respective system.

If the physical variable that is measured of the spin system is denoted by $z$, where $z$ takes the possible outcome values 0 or 1, the above Wigner's friend situation is modelled in the RQM context as follows: $F$ models the situation as the before-after-transition
$$\alpha|0\rangle_S + \beta|1\rangle_S \to |1\rangle_S$$
of the state of $S$ relative to him (here it was assumed that $F$ received the outcome $z = 1$ in his measurement of $S$).

In RQM language, the fact $z = 1$ for the spin of $S$ actualized itself relative to $F$ during the interaction of the two systems.

A different way to model the same situation is again an outside (Wigner's) perspective. From that viewpoint, a measurement by one system ($F$) of another ($S$) results in a correlation of the two systems. The state displaying such a correlation is equally valid for modelling the measurement process. However, the system with respect to which this correlated state is valid changes. Assuming that Wigner ($W$) has the information that the physical variable $z$ of $S$ is being measured by $F$, but not knowing what $F$ received as result, $W$ must model the situation as
$$\big(\alpha|0\rangle_S + \beta|1\rangle_S\big) |\bot\rangle_F \to \alpha\big(|0\rangle_S \otimes |0\rangle_F\big) + \beta\big(|1\rangle_S \otimes |1\rangle_F\big),$$
where $|\bot\rangle_F$ is considered the state of $F$ before the measurement, and $|1\rangle_F$ and $|0\rangle_F$ are the states corresponding to $F$'s state when he has measured 1 or 0 respectively. This model is depicting the situation as relative to $W$, so the assigned states are relative states with respect to the Wigner system. In contrast, there is no value for the $z$ outcome that actualizes with respect to $W$, as he is not involved in the measurement.

In this sense, two accounts of the same situation (process of the measurement of the physical variable $z$ on the system $S$ by $F$) are accepted within RQM to exist side by side. Only when deciding for a reference system, a statement for the "correct" account of the situation can be made.

=== QBism and Bayesian interpretations ===
In the interpretation known as QBism, advocated by N. David Mermin among others, the Wigner's-friend situation does not lead to a paradox, because there is never a uniquely correct wavefunction for any system. Instead, a wavefunction is a statement of personalist Bayesian probabilities, and moreover, the probabilities that wavefunctions encode are probabilities for experiences that are also personal to the agent who experiences them. Jaynes expresses this as follows: "There is a paradox only if we suppose that a density matrix (i.e. a probability distribution) is something 'physically real' and 'absolute'. But now the dilemma disappears when we recognize the 'relativity principle' for probabilities. A density matrix (or, in classical physics, a probability distribution over coordinates and momenta) represents, not a physical situation, but only a certain state of knowledge about a range of possible physical situations". And as von Baeyer puts it, "Wavefunctions are not tethered to electrons and carried along like haloes hovering over the heads of saints—they are assigned by an agent and depend on the total information available to the agent." Consequently, there is nothing wrong in principle with Wigner and his friend assigning different wavefunctions to the same system. A similar position is taken by Brukner, who uses an elaboration of the Wigner's-friend scenario to argue for it.

=== De Broglie–Bohm theory ===
The De Broglie-Bohm theory, also known as Bohmian mechanics or pilot wave theory, postulates, in addition to the wave function, an actual configuration of particles that exists even when unobserved. This particle configuration evolves in time according to a deterministic law, with the wave function guiding the motion of the particles. The particle configuration determines the actual measurement outcome—e.g., whether Schrödinger's cat is dead or alive or whether Wigner's friend has measured 0 or 1—even if the wave function is a superposition. Indeed, according to the De Broglie-Bohm theory, the wave function never collapses on the fundamental level. There is, however, a concept of effective collapse, based on the fact that, in many situations, "empty branches" of the wave function, which do not guide the actual particle configuration, can be ignored for all practical purposes.

The De Broglie-Bohm theory does not assign any special status to conscious observers. In the Wigner's-friend situation, the first measurement would lead to an effective collapse. But even if Wigner describes the state of his friend as a superposition, there is no contradiction with this friend having observed a definite measurement outcome as described by the particle configuration. Thus, according to the De Broglie–Bohm theory, there is no paradox because the wave function alone is not a complete description of the physical state.

== An extension of the Wigner's friend experiment ==
In 2016, Frauchiger and Renner used an elaboration of the Wigner's-friend scenario to argue that quantum theory cannot be used to model physical systems that are themselves agents who use quantum theory. They provide an information-theoretic analysis of two specifically connected pairs of "Wigner's friend" experiments, where the human observers are modelled within quantum theory. By then letting the four different agents reason about each other's measurement results (using the laws of quantum mechanics), contradictory statements are derived.

The resulting theorem highlights an incompatibility of a number of assumptions that are usually taken for granted when modelling measurements in quantum mechanics.

In the title of their published version of September 2018, the authors' interpretation of their result is apparent: Quantum theory as given by the textbook and used in the numerous laboratory experiments to date "cannot consistently describe the use of itself" in any given (hypothetical) scenario. The implications of the result are currently subject to many debates among physicists of both theoretical and experimental quantum mechanics. In particular, the various proponents of the different interpretations of quantum mechanics have challenged the validity of the Frauchiger–Renner argument.

The experiment was designed using a combination of arguments by Wigner (Wigner's friend), Deutsch and Hardy (see Hardy's paradox). The setup involves a number of macroscopic agents (observers) performing predefined quantum measurements in a given time order. Those agents are assumed to all be aware of the whole experiment and to be able to use quantum theory to make statements about other people's measurement results. The design of the thought experiment is such that the different agents' observations along with their logical conclusions drawn from a quantum-theoretical analysis yields inconsistent statements.

The scenario corresponds roughly to two parallel pairs of "Wigners" and friends: $F_1$ with $W_1$ and $F_2$ with $W_2$. The friends each measure a specific spin system, and each Wigner measures "his" friend's laboratory (which includes the friend). The individual agents make logical conclusions that are based on their measurement result, aiming at predictions about other agent's measurements within the protocol. Frauchiger and Renner argue that an inconsistency occurs if three assumptions are taken to be simultaneously valid. Roughly speaking, those assumptions are

- (Q): Quantum theory is correct.
- (C): Agent's predictions are information-theoretically consistent.
- (S): A measurement yields only one single outcome.

More precisely, assumption (Q) involves the probability predictions within quantum theory given by the Born rule. This means that an agent is allowed to trust this rule being correct in assigning probabilities to other outcomes conditioned on his own measurement result. It is, however, sufficient for the extended Wigner's friend experiment to assume the validity of the Born rule for probability-1 cases, i.e., if the prediction can be made with certainty.

Assumption (C) invokes a consistency among different agents' statements in the following manner: The statement "I know (by the theory) that they know (by the same theory) that x" is equivalent to "I know that x".

Assumption (S) specifies that once an agent has arrived at a probability-1 assignment of a certain outcome for a given measurement, they could never agree to a different outcome for the same measurement.

Assumptions (Q) and (S) are used by the agents when reasoning about measurement outcomes of other agents, and assumption (C) comes in when an agent combines other agent's statements with their own. The result is contradictory, and therefore, assumptions (Q), (C) and (S) cannot all be valid, hence the no-go theorem.

=== Reflection ===
The meaning and implications of the Frauchiger–Renner thought experiment are highly debated. A number of assumptions taken in the argument are very foundational in content and therefore cannot be given up easily. However, the question remains whether there are "hidden" assumptions that do not explicitly appear in the argument. The authors themselves conclude that "quantum theory cannot be extrapolated to complex systems, at least not in a straightforward manner". On the other hand, one presentation of the experiment as a quantum circuit models the agents as single qubits and their reasoning as simple conditional operations.

QBism, relational quantum mechanics and the De Broglie–Bohm theory have been argued to avoid the contradiction suggested by the extended Wigner's-friend scenario of Frauchiger and Renner.

== In fiction ==
Stephen Baxter's novel Timelike Infinity (1992) discusses a variation of Wigner's friend thought experiment through a refugee group of humans self-named "The Friends of Wigner". They believe that an ultimate observer at the end of time may collapse all possible entangled wave-functions generated since the beginning of the universe, hence choosing a reality without oppression.

== See also ==
- Quantum suicide and immortality
- Kochen-Specker theorem
