= Group contraction =

Construct in theoretical physics

In theoretical physics, Eugene Wigner and Erdal İnönü have discussed the possibility to obtain from a given Lie group a different (non-isomorphic) Lie group by a group contraction with respect to a continuous subgroup of it. That amounts to a limiting operation on a parameter of the Lie algebra, altering the structure constants of this Lie algebra in a nontrivial singular manner, under suitable circumstances.

For example, the Lie algebra of the 3D rotation group SO(3), [X_{1}, X_{2}] = X_{3}, etc., may be rewritten by a change of variables Y_{1} = εX_{1}, Y_{2} = εX_{2}, Y_{3} = X_{3}, as

[Y_{1}, Y_{2}] = ε^{2} Y_{3}, [Y_{2}, Y_{3}] = Y_{1}, [Y_{3}, Y_{1}] = Y_{2}.

The contraction limit ε → 0 trivializes the first commutator and thus yields the non-isomorphic algebra of the plane Euclidean group, E_{2} ~ ISO(2). (This is isomorphic to the cylindrical group, describing motions of a point on the surface of a cylinder. It is the little group, or stabilizer subgroup, of null four-vectors in Minkowski space.) Specifically, the translation generators Y_{1}, Y_{2}, now generate the Abelian normal subgroup of E_{2} (cf. Group extension), the parabolic Lorentz transformations.

Similar limits, of considerable application in physics (cf. correspondence principles), contract

- the de Sitter group SO(4, 1) ~ Sp(2, 2) to the Poincaré group ISO(3, 1), as the de Sitter radius diverges: R → ∞; or
- the super-anti-de Sitter algebra to the super-Poincaré algebra as the AdS radius diverges R → ∞; or
- the Poincaré group to the Galilei group, as the speed of light diverges: c → ∞; or
- the Moyal bracket Lie algebra (equivalent to quantum commutators) to the Poisson bracket Lie algebra, in the classical limit as the Planck constant vanishes: ħ → 0.
