= Wigner crystal =

Solid (crystalline) phase of electrons

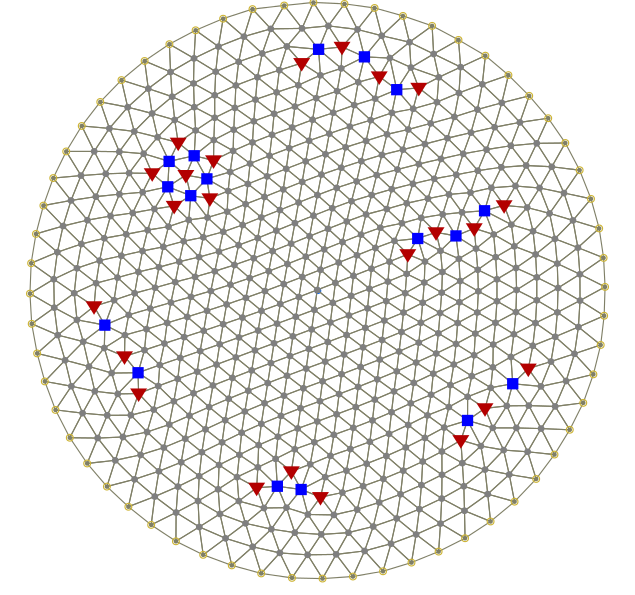
Structure of a two-dimensional Wigner crystal in a parabolic potential trap with 600 electrons. Triangles and squares mark positions of the topological defects.

A Wigner crystal is the solid (crystalline) phase of electrons first predicted by Eugene Wigner in 1934. A gas of electrons moving in a uniform, inert, neutralizing background (i.e. jellium model) will crystallize and form a lattice if the electron density is less than a critical value. This is because the potential energy dominates the kinetic energy at low densities, so the detailed spatial arrangement of the electrons becomes important. To minimize the potential energy, the electrons form a bcc (body-centered cubic) lattice in 3D, a triangular lattice in 2D and an evenly spaced lattice in 1D. Most experimentally observed Wigner clusters exist due to the presence of the external confinement, i.e. external potential trap. As a consequence, deviations from the bcc or triangular lattice are observed. A crystalline state of the 2D electron gas can also be realized by applying a sufficiently strong magnetic field. However, it is still not clear whether it is the Wigner crystallization that has led to observation of insulating behaviour in magnetotransport measurements on 2D electron systems, since other candidates are present, such as Anderson localization.

More generally, a Wigner crystal phase can also refer to a crystal phase occurring in non-electronic systems at low density. In contrast, most crystals melt as the density is lowered. Examples seen in the laboratory are charged colloids or charged plastic spheres.

== Description ==
A uniform electron gas at zero temperature is characterised by a single dimensionless parameter, the so-called Wigner–Seitz radius r_{s} = a/a_{b}, where a is the average inter-particle spacing, and a_{b} is the Bohr radius. The kinetic energy of an electron gas scales as 1/r_{s}^{2}, what can be seen, for instance, by considering a simple Fermi gas. The potential energy, on the other hand, is proportional to 1/r_{s}. When r_{s} becomes larger at low density, the latter becomes dominant and forces the electrons as far apart as possible. As a consequence, they condense into a close-packed lattice. The resulting electron crystal is called the Wigner crystal.

Based on the Lindemann criterion, one can find an estimate for the critical r_{s}. The criterion states that the crystal melts when the root-mean-square displacement of the electrons $\sqrt{\langle r^2\rangle}$ is about a quarter of the lattice spacing a. On the assumption that vibrations of the electrons are approximately harmonic, one can use that for a quantum harmonic oscillator the root mean square displacement in the ground state (in 3D) is given by
$$\sqrt{\langle r^2\rangle} = \sqrt{3 \frac{\hbar }{2 m_e \omega}},$$
with $\hbar$ the Planck constant, m_{e} the electron mass, and ω the characteristic frequency of the oscillations. The latter can be estimated by considering the electrostatic potential energy for an electron displaced by r from its lattice point. Say that the Wigner–Seitz cell associated to the lattice point is approximately a sphere of radius a/2. The uniform, neutralizing background then gives rise to a smeared positive charge of density $6e/a^3\pi$, with $e$ the electron charge. The electric potential felt by the displaced electron as a result of this is given by
$$\varphi(r) = \frac{e}{4 \pi \epsilon_0} \left(\frac{3}{a} - \frac{4 r^2}{a^3}\right),$$
with ε_{0} the vacuum permittivity. Comparing $-e\varphi(r)$ to the energy of a harmonic oscillator, one can read off
$$\frac{1}{2} m_e \omega^2 = \frac{e^2}{\pi \epsilon_0 a^3},$$
or, combining this with the result from the quantum harmonic oscillator for the root-mean-square displacement,
$$\frac{\sqrt{\langle r^2\rangle}}{a} = \sqrt{\frac{3}{8}} \left(\frac{1}{r_s}\right)^{1/4}.$$

The Lindemann criterion then gives us the estimate that r_{s} > 40 is required to give a stable Wigner crystal. Quantum Monte Carlo simulations indicate that the uniform electron gas actually crystallizes at r_{s} = 106 in 3D and r_{s} = 31 in 2D.

For classical systems at elevated temperatures, one uses the average interparticle interaction in units of the temperature: $G = e^2/4\pi\epsilon_0 k_BTa$. The Wigner transition occurs at G = 170 in 3D and G = 125 in 2D. It is believed that ions, such as those of iron, form a Wigner crystal in the interiors of white dwarf stars.

== Experimental realisation ==
In practice, it is difficult to experimentally realize a Wigner crystal because quantum mechanical fluctuations overpower the Coulomb repulsion and quickly cause disorder. Low electron density is needed. One notable example occurs in quantum dots with low electron densities or high magnetic fields where electrons will spontaneously localize in some situations, forming a so-called rotating "Wigner molecule", a crystalline-like state adapted to the finite size of the quantum dot.

Wigner crystallization in a two-dimensional electron gas under high magnetic fields was predicted (and was observed experimentally) to occur for small filling factors (less than $\nu=1/5$) of the lowest Landau level. For larger fractional fillings, the Wigner crystal was thought to be unstable relative to the fractional quantum Hall effect (FQHE) liquid states. A Wigner crystal was observed in the immediate neighborhood of the large fractional filling $\nu=1/3$, and led to a new understanding (based on the pinning of a rotating Wigner molecule) for the interplay between quantum-liquid and pinned-solid phases in the lowest Landau level.

Another experimental realisation of the Wigner crystal occurred in single-electron transistors with very low currents, where a 1D Wigner crystal formed. The current due to each electron can be directly detected experimentally.

Additionally, experiments using quantum wires (short quantum wires are sometimes referred to as 'quantum point contacts', (QPCs)) have led to suggestions of Wigner crystallization in 1D systems. In the experiment performed by Hew et al., a 1D channel was formed by confining electrons in both directions transverse to the electron transport, by the band structure of the GaAs/AlGaAs heterojunction and the potential from the QPC. The device design allowed the electron density in the 1D channel to vary relatively independently of the strength of transverse confining potential, thus allowing experiments to be performed in the regime in which Coulomb interactions between electrons dominate the kinetic energy. Conductance through a QPC shows a series of plateaux quantized in units of the conductance quantum, 2e^{2}/h However, this experiment reported a disappearance of the first plateau (resulting in a jump in conductance of 4e^{2}/h), which was attributed to the formation of two parallel rows of electrons. In a strictly 1D system, electrons occupy equidistant points along a line, i.e. a 1D Wigner crystal. As the electron density increases, the Coulomb repulsion becomes large enough to overcome the electrostatic potential confining the 1D Wigner crystal in the transverse direction, leading to a lateral rearrangement of the electrons into a double-row structure. The evidence of a double row observed by Hew et al. may point towards the beginnings of a Wigner crystal in a 1D system.

In 2018, a transverse magnetic focusing that combines charge and spin detection was used to directly probe a Wigner crystal and its spin properties in 1D quantum wires with tunable width. It provides direct evidence and a better understanding of the nature of zigzag Wigner crystallization by unveiling both the structural and the spin phase diagrams.

Direct evidence for the formation of small Wigner crystals was reported in 2019.

In 2024, physicists managed to directly image a Wigner crystal with a scanning tunneling microscope.

== Wigner crystal materials ==
Some layered Van der Waals materials, such as transition metal dichalcogenides have intrinsically large r_{s} values which exceed the 2D theoretical Wigner crystal limit r_{s} = 31–38. The origin of the large r_{s} is partly due to the suppressed kinetic energy arising from a strong electron phonon interaction which leads to polaronic band narrowing, and partly due to the low carrier density n at low temperatures. The charge density wave (CDW) state in such materials, such as 1T-TaS_{2}, with a sparsely filled √13 × √13 superlattice and r_{s} = 70–100 may be considered to be better described in terms of a Wigner crystal than the more traditional charge density wave. This viewpoint is supported both by modelling and systematic scanning tunnelling microscopy measurements. Thus, Wigner crystal superlattices in so-called CDW systems may be considered to be the first direct observation of ordered electron states localised by mutual Coulomb interaction. An important criterion for is the depth of charge modulation, which depends on the material, and only systems where r_{s} exceeds the theoretical limit can be regarded as Wigner crystals.

In 2020, a direct image of a Wigner crystal observed by microscopy was obtained in molybdenum diselenide/molybdenum disulfide (MoSe_{2}/MoS_{2}) moiré heterostructures.

A 2021 experiment created a Wigner crystal near 0 K by confining electrons using a monolayer sheet of molybdenum diselenide. The sheet was sandwiched between two graphene electrodes and a voltage was applied. The resulting electron spacing was around 20 nanometers, as measured by the stationary appearance of light-agitated excitons.

Another 2021 experiment reported quantum Wigner crystals where quantum fluctuations dominate over the thermal fluctuation in two coupled layers of molybdenum diselenide without any magnetic field. The researchers documented both thermal and quantum melting of the Wigner crystal in this experiment.
