= Goniopora toxin =

Polypeptide toxin from the Goniopora species of coral

Goniopora toxin (GPT) is a polypeptide toxin from the marine Goniopora species coral. Two toxins from this source have been identified, one acting on sodium channels and one acting on calcium channels.

== Chemistry ==
The toxin acting on Na^{+} channels has a molecular weight of 12 kDa and consists of 105 amino acids. The GPT that acts on Ca^{2+} channels has a molecular weight of 19 kDa; its structure is as of yet unknown.

== Mode of action ==
The 12 kDa GPT inhibits the inactivation of Na^{+} channels. This results in a maintained open state of the channel and allows for more Na^{+} influx. As a result, the action potential duration is prolonged. The maintained open state of sodium channels induces a longer-lasting action potential, which allows for persistent activation of calcium channels and more calcium influx. The prolongation of the action potential and its subsequent positive inotropic effect can be influenced by stimulus frequency; at higher frequencies (1 Hz), the effects of GPT were suppressed. Furthermore, the effects of GPT on the sodium channels depend on the membrane potential of the cell preceding GPT binding, suggesting that the effects of GPT are potential-dependent. Also, in the presence of GPT, sodium channels are activated in response to an unusually small depolarizing stimulus. The 19 kDa GPT stimulates Ca^{2+} influx and its activity can be prevented in the presence of a calcium channel blocker. This suggests that GPT directly activates Ca^{2+} channels or indirectly activates Ca^{2+} by influencing sodium currents.

=== GPT effects in different species ===
Frequency-dependent effects of GPT were studied on bullfrog atrial muscle. Application of GPT on the muscle showed broadening of action potential duration and showed a positive inotropic effect. When the stimulus frequency was increased, the effects of GPT were considerably suppressed as opposed to low-frequency stimulation. Also, the action potential was prolonged when long intervals of stimulation (1-3 min), in the presence of GPT, were used. In addition, when the cell membrane was hyperpolarized, the effects of GPT also increased, suggesting a potential-dependent effect on GPT toxicity.

Various GPT concentrations (10 – 100 nM) were added to guinea-pig blood vessels, which induced a contraction of the thoracic aorta, portal vein, and mesenteric and femoral arteries via an action on the innervation of the vessels.

In neuroblastoma cells, even a small depolarizing stimulus can cause activation of sodium channels in the presence of GPT.

In the rabbit myocardium GPT enhances atrial contractility and induce arrhythmias at concentrations above 30 nM. The action potential duration was irreversibly prolonged, but there was no effect on the amplitude of the action potential or an effect on the resting membrane potential.

In guinea-pig ventricular cells, the 12 kDa GPT prolonged the action potential by acting on sodium channels, again with no effect on action potential amplitude and the resting membrane potential.

At a concentration of 1.7 μM, the 19 kDa GPT induced contraction of the guinea pig ileum. This contraction was inhibited by a calcium channel blocker.

In cultured chick cardiac cells the 19 kDa GPT induced an activation of calcium influx. The concentration that resulted in a half-maximum activation of calcium influx was 5.3 μM.

== Toxicity and treatment ==
GPT is highly toxic, with a lethal dose found in mice of 0.3-0.5 mg/kg when the 12 kDa GPT was injected intraperitoneally. Symptoms consist of hypersensitivity, paralysis of hind limbs, diarrhea, rigidity of the entire body, and GPT can lead to a blue or purple discoloration of the skin. Tetrodotoxin, a sodium channel blocker, can be administered to suppress the prolonged action potential. Ca^{2+}-channel blockers (e.g. nitrendipine and desmethoxyverapamil) can be used to suppress the effects of the calcium channel toxin.
