= Wigner fusion =

The Wigner fusion research groups are involved in magnetically confined nuclear fusion experiments around the world. Wigner fusion consists of research groups from four different research institutes and universities, 3 if which are located in the Department of Plasma Physics at the Wigner Research Centre for Physics, one in the Institute of Nuclear Techniques (INT) of the Budapest University of Technology and Economics other specialist are involved from the Centre for Energy Research and from the Institute for Nuclear Research of the Hungarian Academy of Sciences, in the coordination of the Wigner Research Centre for Physics. Wigner fusion connected to the European fusion research programme through EUROfusion consortium which coordinated fusion research in Europe. At Wigner fusion more than 40 researchers, engineers and technicians work together in these research groups who are involved in more than half a dozen magnetic confinement experiments around the world, such as ITER, JET, Asdex-Upgrade, W7-X, KSTAR, EAST, MAST-Upgrade and COMPASS.

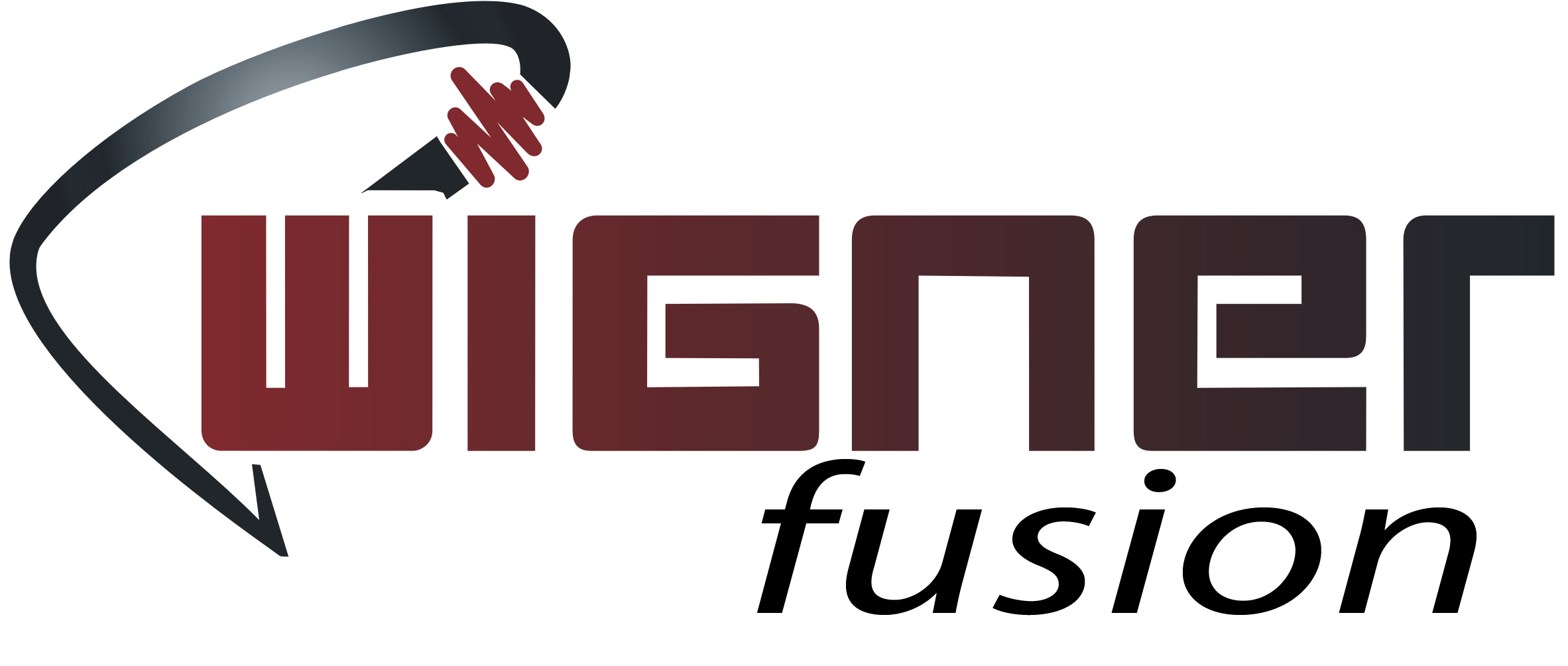
Wigner fusion logo

The research groups of Wigner fusion:

- Pellet and Video Diagnostics Group, Wigner RCP
- ITER and Fusion Diagnostics Group, Wigner RCP
- Beam Emission Spectroscopy Group, Wigner RCP
- Fusion Research Group, BME NTI

1. Europe launches EUROfusion to make fusion energy a reality - Horizon 2020 Projects

== See also ==
- EUROfusion
- Nuclear fusion
