= Wigner–Seitz radius =

The Wigner–Seitz radius $r_{\rm s}$, named after Eugene Wigner and Frederick Seitz, is the radius of a sphere whose volume is equal to the mean volume per atom in a solid (for first group metals). In the more general case of metals having more valence electrons, $r_{\rm s}$ is the radius of a sphere whose volume is equal to the volume per a free electron. This parameter is used frequently in condensed matter physics to describe the density of a system. $r_{\rm s}$ is typically calculated for bulk materials.

== Formula ==
In a 3-D system with $N$ free valence electrons in a volume $V$, the Wigner–Seitz radius is defined by

$$\frac{4}{3} \pi r_{\rm s}^3 = \frac{V}{N} = \frac{1}{n}\,$$

where n is the particle density. Solving for $r_{\rm s}$ we obtain

$$r_{\rm s} = \sqrt[3]{\frac{3}{4\pi n}}.$$

The radius can also be calculated as
$$r_{\rm s}= \sqrt[3]{\frac{3M}{4\pi \rho N_{V} N_{\rm A}}}$$
where M is molar mass, N_{V} is the count of free valence electrons per particle, ρ is the mass density, and N_{A} is the Avogadro constant, 6.02214076×10^{23} mol^{−1}.

This parameter is normally reported in atomic units, i.e., in units of the Bohr radius.

Assuming that each atom in a simple metal cluster occupies the same volume as in a solid, the radius of the cluster is given by
$$R_0 = r_s n^{1/3}$$
where n is the number of atoms.

Values of $r_{\rm s}$ for the first group metals:

Element	r_{s} in a_{0}
^{7}Li	3.25
^{23}Na	3.93
^{39}K	4.86
^{85}Rb	5.20
^{133}Cs	5.62

Wigner–Seitz radius is related to the electronic density by the formula
$$r_s =0.62035 \rho^{1/3}$$
where ρ can be regarded as the average electronic density in the outer portion of the Wigner-Seitz cell.

== See also ==
- Wigner–Seitz cell
- Wigner crystal
