= Modified Wigner distribution function =

Variation of the Wigner distribution function

Note: the Wigner distribution function is abbreviated here as WD rather than WDF as used at Wigner distribution function

A Modified Wigner distribution function is a variation of the Wigner distribution function (WD) with reduced or removed cross-terms.

The Wigner distribution (WD) was first proposed for corrections to classical statistical mechanics in 1932 by Eugene Wigner. The Wigner distribution function, or Wigner–Ville distribution (WVD) for analytic signals, also has applications in time frequency analysis. The Wigner distribution gives better auto term localisation compared to the smeared out spectrogram (SP). However, when applied to a signal with multi frequency components, cross terms appear due to its quadratic nature. Several methods have been proposed to reduce the cross terms. For example, in 1994 Ljubiša Stanković proposed a novel technique, now mostly referred to as S-method, resulting in the reduction or removal of cross terms. The concept of the S-method is a combination between the spectrogram and the Pseudo Wigner Distribution (PWD), the windowed version of the WD.

The original WD, the spectrogram, and the modified WDs all belong to the Cohen's class of bilinear time-frequency representations :

$$C_x(t, f)=\int_{-\infty}^{\infty}\int_{-\infty}^{\infty}W_x(\theta,\nu) \Pi(t - \theta,f - \nu)\, d\theta\, d\nu \quad = [W_x\,\ast\,\Pi] (t,f)$$

where $\Pi \left(t, f\right)$ is Cohen's kernel function, which is often a low-pass function, and normally serves to mask out the interference in the original Wigner representation.

== Mathematical definition ==
- Wigner distribution

$$W_x(t,f) = \int_{-\infty}^\infty x(t+\tau/2) x^*(t-\tau/2) e^{-j2\pi\tau f} \, d\tau$$

Cohen's kernel function : $\Pi (t,f) = \delta_{(0,0)} (t,f)$

- Spectrogram

$$SP_x (t,f) = |ST_x (t,f)|^2 = ST_x (t,f)\,ST_x^* (t,f)$$

where $ST_x$ is the short-time Fourier transform of $x$.

$$ST_x(t,f) = \int_{-\infty}^\infty x(\tau) w^*(t-\tau) e^{-j2\pi f\tau} \, d\tau$$

Cohen's kernel function : $\Pi (t,f) = W_h(t,f)$ which is the WD of the window function itself. This can be verified by applying the convolution property of the Wigner distribution function.

The spectrogram cannot produce interference since it is a positive-valued quadratic distribution.

- Modified form I

$W_x(t,f) = \int_{-B}^B w(\tau)x(t+\tau/2) x^*(t-\tau/2) e^{-j2\pi\tau f} \, d\tau$

Can't solve the cross term problem, however it can solve the problem of 2 components time difference larger than window size B.

- Modified form II

$W_x(t,f) = \int_{-B}^B w(\eta)X(f+\eta/2) X^*(f-\eta/2) e^{j2\pi t \eta} \, d\eta$

- Modified form III (Pseudo L-Wigner Distribution)

$W_x(t,f) = \int_{-\infty}^\infty w(\tau)x^L(t+\tau/(2L)) \overline{x^{*L}(t-\tau/(2L))} e^{-j2\pi \tau f} \, d\tau$

Where L is any integer greater than 0

Increase L can reduce the influence of cross term (however it can't eliminate completely )

For example, for L=2, the dominant third term is divided by 4 ( which is equivalent to 12dB ).

This gives a significant improvement over the Wigner Distribution.

Properties of L-Wigner Distribution:

1. The L-Wigner Distribution is always real.
2. If the signal is time shifted $x(t-t0)$, then its LWD is time shifted as well, $LWD: W_x(t-t0,f)$
3. The LWD of a modulated signal $x(t)\exp(j\omega_0 t)$is shifted in frequency $LWD: W_x(t,f-f0)$
4. Is the signal $x(t)$is time limited, i.e.,$x(t)=0$ $for \left\vert t \right\vert >T,$ then the L-Wigner distribution is time limited, $LWD: W_x(t,f)=0$ $for\left\vert t \right\vert >T$
5. If the signal $x(t)$is band limited with $f_m$($F(f)=0$$for \left\vert f \right\vert > f_m$), then $LWD: W_x(t,f)$is limited in the frequency domain by $f_m$as well.
6. Integral of L-Wigner distribution over frequency is equal to the generalized signal power: $\int_{-\infty}^\infty W_x(t, f)df = \left\vert x(t) \right\vert ^{2L}$
7. Integral of $LWD: W_x(t,f)$over time and frequency is equal to the $2L^{th}$power of the $2L^{th}$norm of signal $x(t)$:

$\int_{-\infty}^\infty \int_{-\infty}^\infty W_x(t,f)dtdf = \int_{-\infty}^\infty \left\vert x(t) \right\vert ^{2L} dt = \lVert x(t) \rVert _{2L} ^{2L}$

1. The integral over time is:

$\int_{-\infty}^\infty W_x(t,f)dt = \left\vert F_L(f) \right\vert ^2=\left\vert \underbrace{ F(L_f)*F(L_f)*\cdots*F(L_f) }_{L times} \right\vert ^2$

1. For a large value of $L(L\rightarrow \infty)$We may neglect all values of $LWD: W_x(t,f)$, Comparing them to the one at the points $(t_m, f_m)$, where the distribution reaches its essential supremum:

$$\lim_{L \to \infty} (W_x(t,f)/W_x(t_m,f_m)) = \begin{cases} 0, & \text{if }f \neq f_m\text{  or }t\neq t_m\text{ } \\ 1, & \text{if }f=f_m\text{ and } t=t_m\end{cases}$$

- Modified form IV (Polynomial Wigner Distribution Function)

$W_x(t,f) = \int_{-B}^B [\textstyle \prod_{l=1}^{q/2} \displaystyle x(t+d_l \tau) x^*(t- d_{-l} \tau)] e^{-j2\pi\tau f} \, d\tau$

When $q=2$ and $d_l=d_{-l}=0.5$, it becomes the original Wigner distribution function.

It can avoid the cross term when the order of phase of the exponential function is no larger than $q/2+1$

However the cross term between two components cannot be removed.

$d_l$should be chosen properly such that

$\textstyle \prod_{l=1}^{q/2} \displaystyle x(t+d_l \tau) x^*(t-d_{-l}\tau)=\exp\big(j2\pi\textstyle \sum_{n=1}^{q/2+1} n a_n t^{n-1}\tau \displaystyle\big)$

$W_x(t,f) = \int_{-\infty}^\infty \exp\Bigl(-j2\pi (f-\sum_{n=1}^{q/2+1}na_nt^{n-1})\tau\Bigr)d\tau$

$\cong \delta\bigl(f-\sum_{n=1}^{q/2+1}na_nt^{n-1}\bigr)$

If $x(t)=\exp\bigl(j2\pi\sum_{n=1}^{q/2+1}a_nt^n\bigr)$

when $q=2$ , $x(t+d_l \tau) x^*(t-d_{-l}\tau)=\exp\bigl(j2\pi\sum_{n=1}^{q/2+1}na_nt^{n-1}\tau\bigr)$

$a_2(t+d_l\tau)^2+a_1(t+d_l\tau)-a_2(t-d_{-l}\tau)^2-a_1(t-d_{-l}\tau)=2a_2t\tau+a_1\tau$

$\Longrightarrow d_l+d_{-l}=1, d_l-d_{-l}=0$

$\Longrightarrow d_l=d_{-l}=1/2$

- Pseudo Wigner distribution

$$PW_x(t,f) = \int_{-\infty}^\infty w(\tau/2) w^*(-\tau/2) x(t+\tau/2) x^*(t-\tau/2) e^{-j2\pi\tau\,f} \, d\tau$$

Cohen's kernel function : $\Pi (t,f) = \delta_0 (t)\,W_h(t,f)$ which is concentred on the frequency axis.

Note that the pseudo Wigner can also be written as the Fourier transform of the “spectral-correlation” of the STFT

$$PW_x(t,f) = \int_{-\infty}^\infty ST_x(t, f+\nu/2) ST_x^*(t, f-\nu/2) e^{j2\pi\nu\,t} \, d\nu$$

- Smoothed pseudo Wigner distribution :

In the pseudo Wigner the time windowing acts as a frequency direction smoothing. Therefore, it suppresses the Wigner distribution interference components that oscillate in the frequency direction. Time direction smoothing can be implemented by a time-convolution of the PWD with a lowpass function $q$ :

$$SPW_x(t,f) = [ q\,\ast\, PW_x (.,f)] (t) =  \int_{-\infty}^\infty q(t-u) \int_{-\infty}^\infty w(\tau/2) w^*(-\tau/2) x(u+\tau/2) x^*(u-\tau/2) e^{-j2\pi\tau\,f} \, d\tau\, du$$

Cohen's kernel function : $\Pi (t,f) = q(t)\, W(f)$ where $W$ is the Fourier transform of the window $w$.

Thus the kernel corresponding to the smoothed pseudo Wigner distribution has a separable form. Note that even if the SPWD and the S-Method both smooths the WD in the time domain, they are not equivalent in general.

- S-method

$$SM(t,f) = \int_{-\infty}^\infty ST_x(t, f+\nu/2) ST_x^*(t, f-\nu/2) G(\nu) e^{j2\pi\nu\,t} \, d\nu$$

Cohen's kernel function : $\Pi (t,f) = g(t)\, W_h(t,f)$

The S-method limits the range of the integral of the PWD with a low-pass windowing function $g(t)$ of Fourier transform $G(f)$. This results in the cross-term removal, without blurring the auto-terms that are well-concentred along the frequency axis. The S-method strikes a balance in smoothing between the pseudo-Wigner distribution $PW_x$ [$g(t) = 1$] and the power spectrogram $SP_x$ [$g(t) = \delta_0 (t)$].

Note that in the original 1994 paper, Stankovic defines the S-methode with a modulated version of the short-time Fourier transform :

$$SM(t,f) = \int_{-\infty}^\infty \tilde{ST}_x(t,f+\nu) \tilde{ST}_x^*(t,f-\nu) P(\nu)\, d\nu$$

where

$$\tilde{ST}_x(t,f) = \int_{-\infty}^\infty x(t+\tau) w^*(\tau) e^{-j2\pi f\tau} \, d\tau \quad = ST_x(t,f)\,e^{j2\pi f t}$$

Even in this case we still have

$$\Pi (t,f) = p(2t)\, W_h(t,f)$$

== See also ==
- Time-frequency representation
- Wigner distribution function
- Bilinear time–frequency distribution
- Short-time Fourier transform
- Gabor transform
