= Generalized probabilistic theory =

A generalized probabilistic theory (GPT) is a general framework to describe the operational features of arbitrary physical theories. A GPT must specify what kind of physical systems one can find in the lab, as well as rules to compute the outcome statistics of any experiment involving labeled preparations, transformations and measurements. The framework of GPTs has been used to define hypothetical non-quantum physical theories which nonetheless possess quantum theory's most remarkable features, such as entanglement or teleportation. Notably, a small set of physically motivated axioms is enough to single out the GPT representation of quantum theory.

The mathematical formalism of GPTs has been developed since the 1950s and 1960s by many authors, and rediscovered independently several times. The earliest ideas are due to Segal and Mackey, although the first comprehensive and mathematically rigorous treatment can be traced back to the work of Ludwig, Dähn, and Stolz, all three based at the University of Marburg. While the formalism in these earlier works is less similar to the modern one, already in the early 1970s the ideas of the Marburg school had matured and the notation had developed towards the modern usage, thanks also to the independent contribution of Davies and Lewis. The books by Ludwig and the proceedings of a conference held in Marburg in 1973 offer a comprehensive account of these early developments. The term "generalized probabilistic theory" itself was coined by Jonathan Barrett in 2007, based on the version of the framework introduced by Lucien Hardy.

Note that some authors use the term operational probabilistic theory (OPT). OPTs are an alternative way to define hypothetical non-quantum physical theories, based on the language of category theory, in which one specifies the axioms that should be satisfied by observations.

== Definition ==
A GPT is specified by a number of mathematical structures, namely:

- a family of state spaces, each of which represents a physical system;
- a composition rule (usually corresponds to a tensor product), which specifies how joint state spaces are formed;
- a set of measurements, which map states to probabilities and are usually described by an effect algebra;
- a set of possible physical operations, i.e., transformations that map state spaces to state spaces.

It can be argued that if one can prepare a state $x$ and a different state $y$, then one can also toss a (possibly biased) coin which lands on one side with probability $p$ and on the other with probability $1-p$ and prepare either $x$ or $y$, depending on the side the coin lands on. The resulting state is a statistical mixture of the states $x$ and $y$ and in GPTs such statistical mixtures are described by convex combinations, in this case $px+(1-p)y$. For this reason all state spaces are assumed to be convex sets. Following a similar reasoning, one can argue that also the set of measurement outcomes and set of physical operations must be convex.

Additionally it is always assumed that measurement outcomes and physical operations are affine maps, i.e. that if $\Phi$ is a physical transformation, then we must have
$$\Phi(px+(1-p)y) = p\Phi(x) + (1-p) \Phi(y)$$
and similarly for measurement outcomes. This follows from the argument that we should obtain the same outcome if we first prepare a statistical mixture and then apply the physical operation, or if we prepare a statistical mixture of the outcomes of the physical operations.

Note that physical operations are a subset of all affine maps which transform states into states as we must require that a physical operation yields a valid state even when it is applied to a part of a system (the notion of "part" is subtle: it is specified by explaining how different system types compose and how the global parameters of the composite system are affected by local operations).

For practical reasons it is often assumed that a general GPT is embedded in a finite-dimensional vector space, although infinite-dimensional formulations exist.

== Classical, quantum, and beyond ==
Classical theory is a GPT where states correspond to probability distributions and both measurements and physical operations are stochastic maps. One can see that in this case all state spaces are simplexes.

Standard quantum information theory is a GPT where system types are described by a natural number $D$ which corresponds to the complex Hilbert space dimension. States of the systems of Hilbert space dimension $D$ are described by the normalized positive semidefinite matrices, i.e. by the density matrices. Measurements are identified with Positive Operator valued Measures (POVMs), and the physical operations are completely positive maps. Systems compose via the tensor product of the underlying complex Hilbert spaces.

Real quantum theory is the GPT which is obtained from standard quantum information theory by restricting the theory to real Hilbert spaces. It does not satisfy the axiom of local tomography.

The framework of GPTs has provided examples of consistent physical theories which cannot be embedded in quantum theory and indeed exhibit very non-quantum features. One of the first ones was Box-world, the theory with maximal non-local correlations. Other examples are theories with third-order interference and the family of GPTs known as generalized bits.

Many features that were considered purely quantum are actually present in all non-classical GPTs. These include the impossibility of universal broadcasting, i.e., the no-cloning theorem; the existence of incompatible measurements; and the existence of entangled states or entangled measurements.

== See also ==
- Quantum foundations
