= Quasiprobability distribution =

Concept in statistics

A quasiprobability distribution is a mathematical object similar to a probability distribution but which relaxes some of Kolmogorov's axioms of probability theory. Quasiprobability distributions arise naturally in the study of quantum mechanics when treated in phase space formulation, commonly used in quantum optics, time-frequency analysis, and elsewhere.

Quasiprobabilities share several of general features with ordinary probabilities, such as, crucially, the ability to yield expectation values with respect to the weights of the distribution. However, they can violate the σ-additivity axiom: integrating over them does not necessarily yield probabilities of mutually exclusive states. Quasiprobability distributions also have regions of negative probability density, counterintuitively, contradicting the first axiom.

== Introduction ==
In the most general form, the dynamics of a quantum-mechanical system are determined by a master equation in Hilbert space: an equation of motion for the density operator (usually written $\widehat{\rho}$) of the system. The density operator is defined with respect to a complete orthonormal basis. Although it is possible to directly integrate this equation for very small systems (i.e., systems with few particles or degrees of freedom), this quickly becomes intractable for larger systems. However, it is possible to prove that the density operator can always be written in a diagonal form, provided that it is with respect to an overcomplete basis. When the density operator is represented in such an overcomplete basis, then it can be written in a manner more resembling of an ordinary function, at the expense that the function has the features of a quasiprobability distribution. The evolution of the system is then completely determined by the evolution of the quasiprobability distribution function.

The coherent states, i.e. right eigenstates of the annihilation operator $\widehat{a}$ serve as the overcomplete basis in the construction described above. By definition, the coherent states have the following property,
$$\begin{align}
\widehat{a}|\alpha\rangle&=\alpha|\alpha\rangle \\[1ex]
\langle\alpha|\widehat{a}^{\dagger}&=\langle\alpha|\alpha^*.
\end{align}$$

They also have some further interesting properties. For example, no two coherent states are orthogonal. In fact, if |α⟩ and |β⟩ are a pair of coherent states, then
$$\langle\beta\mid\alpha\rangle = e^{-\frac{1}{2}(\left|\beta\right|^2 + \left|\alpha\right|^2 - 2 \beta^* \alpha)} \neq \delta(\alpha-\beta).$$
Note that these states are, however, correctly normalized with ⟨α|α⟩ = 1. Owing to the completeness of the basis of Fock states, the choice of the basis of coherent states must be overcomplete. Click to show an informal proof.

Proof of the overcompleteness of the coherent states

Integration over the complex plane can be written in terms of polar coordinates with $d^2\alpha=r \, dr \, d\theta$. Where exchanging sum and integral is allowed, we arrive at a simple integral expression of the gamma function:
$$\begin{align}\int |\alpha\rangle\langle\alpha| \, d^2\alpha
&= \int \sum_{n=0}^\infty\sum_{k=0}^\infty e^{-{|\alpha|^2}} \cdot \frac{\alpha^n (\alpha^*)^k}{\sqrt{n!k!}} |n\rangle \langle k| \, d^2\alpha \\
&= \int_0^\infty \int_0^{2\pi} \sum_{n=0}^{\infty}\sum_{k=0}^\infty e^{-{r^2}} \cdot \frac{r^{n+k+1}e^{i(n-k)\theta}}{\sqrt{n!k!}} |n\rangle \langle k| \, d\theta \,dr \\
&= \sum_{n=0}^\infty \int_0^\infty \sum_{k=0}^\infty \int_0^{2\pi} e^{-{r^2}} \cdot \frac{r^{n+k+1}e^{i(n-k)\theta}}{\sqrt{n!k!}} |n\rangle \langle k| \, d\theta \,dr \\
&= 2\pi \sum_{n=0}^\infty \int_0^\infty \sum_{k=0}^\infty e^{-{r^2}} \cdot \frac{r^{n+k+1}\delta(n-k)}{\sqrt{n!k!}} |n\rangle \langle k| \, dr \\
&= 2\pi \sum_{n=0}^\infty \int e^{-{r^2}} \cdot \frac{r^{2n+1}}{n!} |n\rangle \langle n| \, dr \\
&= \pi \sum_{n=0}^\infty \int e^{-u} \cdot \frac{u^n}{n!} |n\rangle \langle n| \, du \\
&= \pi \sum_{n=0}^\infty |n\rangle \langle n| \\
&= \pi \widehat{I}.\end{align}$$

Clearly, one can span the Hilbert space by writing a state as
$$|\psi\rangle = \frac{1}{\pi} \int |\alpha\rangle\langle\alpha|\psi\rangle \, d^2\alpha.$$

On the other hand, despite correct normalization of the states, the factor of π > 1 proves that this basis is overcomplete.

In the coherent states basis, however, it is always possible to express the density operator in the diagonal form
$$\widehat{\rho} = \int f(\alpha,\alpha^*) |\alpha\rangle \langle \alpha| \, d^2\alpha$$
where f is a representation of the phase space distribution. This function f is considered a quasiprobability density because it has the following properties:

- $\int f(\alpha,\alpha^*) \, d^2\alpha = \operatorname{tr}(\widehat{\rho}) = 1$ (normalization)
- If $g_\Omega (\widehat{a},\widehat{a}^\dagger)$ is an operator that can be expressed as a power series of the creation and annihilation operators in an ordering Ω, then its expectation value is
  $$\langle g_{\Omega} (\widehat{a},\widehat{a}^\dagger) \rangle = \int f(\alpha,\alpha^*) g_\Omega(\alpha,\alpha^*) \, d\alpha \, d\alpha^*$$
  (optical equivalence theorem).

There exists a family of different representations, each connected to a different ordering Ω. The most popular in the general physics literature and historically first of these is the Wigner quasiprobability distribution, which is related to symmetric operator ordering. In quantum optics specifically, often the operators of interest, especially the particle number operator, is naturally expressed in normal order. In that case, the corresponding representation of the phase space distribution is the Glauber–Sudarshan P representation. The quasiprobabilistic nature of these phase space distributions is best understood in the P representation because of the following key statement:

If the quantum system has a classical analog, e.g. a coherent state or thermal radiation, then P is non-negative everywhere like an ordinary probability distribution. If, however, the quantum system has no classical analog, e.g. an incoherent Fock state or entangled system, then P is negative somewhere or more singular than a delta function.

This sweeping statement is inoperative in other representations. For example, the Wigner function of the EPR state is positive definite but has no classical analog.

In addition to the representations defined above, there are many other quasiprobability distributions that arise in alternative representations of the phase space distribution. Another popular representation is the Husimi Q representation, which is useful when operators are in anti-normal order. More recently, the positive P representation and a wider class of generalized P representations have been used to solve complex problems in quantum optics. These are all equivalent and interconvertible to each other, viz. Cohen's class distribution function.

== Characteristic functions ==
Analogous to probability theory, quantum quasiprobability distributions can be written in terms of characteristic functions, from which all operator expectation values can be derived. The characteristic functions for the Wigner, Glauber P and Q distributions of an N mode system are as follows:

- $\chi_W(\mathbf{z},\mathbf{z}^*)= \operatorname{tr}\left[\rho \exp\left(i\mathbf{z}\cdot\widehat{\mathbf{a}} + i\mathbf{z}^*\cdot\widehat{\mathbf{a}}^{\dagger}\right)\right]$
- $\chi_P(\mathbf{z},\mathbf{z}^*) = \operatorname{tr}\left[\rho \exp\left(i\mathbf{z}^*\cdot\widehat{\mathbf{a}}^{\dagger}\right) \exp\left(i\mathbf{z}\cdot\widehat{\mathbf{a}}\right)\right]$
- $\chi_Q(\mathbf{z},\mathbf{z}^*)=\operatorname{tr}\left[\rho \exp\left(i\mathbf{z}\cdot\widehat{\mathbf{a}}\right) \exp\left(i\mathbf{z}^*\cdot\widehat{\mathbf{a}}^{\dagger}\right)\right]$

Here $\widehat{\mathbf{a}}$ and $\widehat{\mathbf{a}}^{\dagger}$ are vectors containing the annihilation and creation operators for each mode of the system. These characteristic functions can be used to directly evaluate expectation values of operator moments. The ordering of the annihilation and creation operators in these moments is specific to the particular characteristic function. For instance, normally ordered (creation operators preceding annihilation operators) moments can be evaluated in the following way from $\chi_P\,$:

$$\left\langle\widehat{a}_j^{\dagger m}\widehat{a}_k^n\right\rangle = \left.\frac{\partial^{m+n}}{\partial(iz_j^*)^m\partial(iz_k)^n}\chi_P(\mathbf{z},\mathbf{z}^*)\right|_{\mathbf{z}=\mathbf{z}^*=0}$$

In the same way, expectation values of anti-normally ordered and symmetrically ordered combinations of annihilation and creation operators can be evaluated from the characteristic functions for the Q and Wigner distributions, respectively. The quasiprobability functions themselves are defined as Fourier transforms of the above characteristic functions. That is,

$$\{W\mid P\mid Q\}(\mathbf{\alpha},\mathbf{\alpha}^*)=\frac{1}{\pi^{2N}}\int \chi_{\{W\mid P\mid Q\}}(\mathbf{z},\mathbf{z}^*)e^{-i\mathbf{z}^*\cdot\mathbf{\alpha}^*}e^{-i\mathbf{z} \cdot \mathbf{\alpha}} \, d^{2N}\mathbf{z}.$$

Here $\alpha_j\,$ and $\alpha^*_k$ may be identified as coherent state amplitudes in the case of the Glauber P and Q distributions, but simply c-numbers for the Wigner function. Since differentiation in normal space becomes multiplication in Fourier space, moments can be calculated from these functions in the following way:

- $\langle\widehat{\mathbf{a}}_j^{\dagger m}\widehat{\mathbf{a}}_k^n\rangle=\int P(\mathbf{\alpha},\mathbf{\alpha}^*)\alpha_j^n\alpha_k^{*m} \, d^{2N}\mathbf{\alpha}$
- $\langle\widehat{\mathbf{a}}_j^m\widehat{\mathbf{a}}_k^{\dagger n}\rangle=\int Q(\mathbf{\alpha},\mathbf{\alpha}^*)\alpha_j^m\alpha_k^{*n} \, d^{2N}\mathbf{\alpha}$
- $\langle(\widehat{\mathbf{a}}_j^{\dagger m}\widehat{\mathbf{a}}_k^n)_S\rangle=\int W(\mathbf{\alpha},\mathbf{\alpha}^*)\alpha_j^m\alpha_k^{*n} \, d^{2N}\mathbf{\alpha}$

Here $(\cdots)_S$ denotes symmetric ordering.

These representations are all interrelated through convolution by Gaussian functions, Weierstrass transforms,

- $W(\alpha,\alpha^*)= \frac{2}{\pi} \int P(\beta,\beta^*) e^{-2|\alpha-\beta|^2} \, d^2\beta$
- $Q(\alpha,\alpha^*)= \frac{2}{\pi} \int W(\beta,\beta^*) e^{-2|\alpha-\beta|^2} \, d^2\beta$

or, using the property that convolution is associative,
$$Q(\alpha,\alpha^*)= \frac{1}{\pi} \int P(\beta,\beta^*) e^{-|\alpha-\beta|^2} \, d^2\beta ~.$$

It follows that
$$P(\alpha,\alpha^*)= \frac{1}{\pi^2} \int Q(\beta,\beta^*) e^{|\lambda|^2+\lambda^* ( \alpha-\beta) -\lambda ( \alpha-\beta) ^*} \, d^2\beta ~d^2\lambda,$$

an often divergent integral, indicating P is often a distribution. Q is always broader than P for the same density matrix.

For example, for a thermal state,
$$\hat \rho= \frac{1}{\bar n +1}\sum_{n=0}^\infty \left (\frac{\bar n}{1+\bar n }\right)^n |n\rangle \langle n|~,$$
one has
$$P(\alpha)= \frac{1}{\pi \bar n } e^{-\frac{|\alpha|^2}{\bar n}}, \qquad
Q(\alpha)= \frac{1}{\pi (1+ \bar n) } e^{-\frac{|\alpha|^2}{1+\bar n}}~.$$

== Time evolution and operator correspondences ==
Since each of the above transformations from ρ to the distribution functions is linear, the equation of motion for each distribution can be obtained by performing the same transformations to $\dot{\rho}$. Furthermore, as any master equation which can be expressed in Lindblad form is completely described by the action of combinations of annihilation and creation operators on the density operator, it is useful to consider the effect such operations have on each of the quasiprobability functions.

For instance, consider the annihilation operator $\widehat{a}_j\,$ acting on ρ. For the characteristic function of the P distribution we have
$$\operatorname{tr}(\widehat{a}_j\rho e^{i\mathbf{z}^*\cdot\widehat{\mathbf{a}}^{\dagger}} e^{i\mathbf{z}\cdot\widehat{\mathbf{a}}}) = \frac{\partial}{\partial(iz_j)}\chi_P(\mathbf{z},\mathbf{z}^*).$$

Taking the Fourier transform with respect to $\mathbf{z}\,$ to find the action corresponding action on the Glauber P function, we find
$$\widehat{a}_j\rho \rightarrow \alpha_j P(\mathbf{\alpha},\mathbf{\alpha}^*).$$

By following this procedure for each of the above distributions, the following operator correspondences can be identified:

- $\widehat{a}_j\rho \rightarrow \left(\alpha_j + \kappa\frac{\partial}{\partial\alpha_j^*}\right)\{W\mid P\mid Q\}(\mathbf{\alpha},\mathbf{\alpha}^*)$
- $\rho\widehat{a}^\dagger_j \rightarrow \left(\alpha_j^* + \kappa\frac{\partial}{\partial\alpha_j}\right)\{W\mid P\mid Q\}(\mathbf{\alpha},\mathbf{\alpha}^*)$
- $\widehat{a}^\dagger_j\rho \rightarrow \left(\alpha_j^* - (1-\kappa)\frac{\partial}{\partial\alpha_j}\right)\{W\mid P\mid Q\}(\mathbf{\alpha},\mathbf{\alpha}^*)$
- $\rho\widehat{a}_j \rightarrow \left(\alpha_j - (1-\kappa)\frac{\partial}{\partial\alpha_j^*}\right)\{W\mid P\mid Q\}(\mathbf{\alpha},\mathbf{\alpha}^*)$

Here κ = 0, 1/2 or 1 for P, Wigner, and Q distributions, respectively. In this way, master equations can be expressed as an equations of motion of quasiprobability functions.

== Examples ==
=== Coherent state ===
By construction, P for a coherent state $|\alpha_0\rangle$ is simply a delta function:
$$P(\alpha,\alpha^*)=\delta^2(\alpha-\alpha_0).$$
The Wigner and Q representations follows immediately from the Gaussian convolution formulas above,
$$\begin{align}
W(\alpha,\alpha^*) &= \frac{2}{\pi} \int \delta^2(\beta-\alpha_0) e^{-2|\alpha-\beta|^2} \, d^2\beta \\[1ex]
&= \frac{2}{\pi}e^{-2|\alpha-\alpha_0|^2} \\[1.5ex]
Q(\alpha,\alpha^*) &= \frac{1}{\pi} \int \delta^2(\beta-\alpha_0) e^{-|\alpha-\beta|^2} \, d^2\beta \\[1ex]
&= \frac{1}{\pi}e^{-|\alpha-\alpha_0|^2}.
\end{align}$$

The Husimi representation can also be found using the formula above for the inner product of two coherent states,
$$Q(\alpha,\alpha^*)=\frac{1}{\pi}\langle \alpha|\widehat{\rho}|\alpha\rangle =\frac{1}{\pi}|\langle \alpha_0|\alpha\rangle|^2 = \frac{1}{\pi}e^{-|\alpha-\alpha_0|^2}$$

=== Fock state ===
The P representation of a Fock state $|n\rangle$ is
$$P(\alpha,\alpha^*)=\frac{e^{|\alpha|^2}}{n!} \frac{\partial^{2n}}{\partial\alpha^{*n}\,\partial\alpha^n} \delta^2(\alpha).$$

Since for n>0 this is more singular than a delta function, a Fock state has no classical analog. The non-classicality is less transparent as one proceeds with the Gaussian convolutions. If L_{n} is the n-th Laguerre polynomial, W is
$$W(\alpha,\alpha^*) = {\left(-1\right)}^n \frac{2}{\pi} e^{-2|\alpha|^2} L_n{\left(4|\alpha|^2\right)} ~,$$
which can go negative but is bounded.

Q, by contrast, always remains positive and bounded,
$$Q(\alpha,\alpha^*)=\frac{1}{\pi}\langle \alpha|\widehat{\rho}|\alpha\rangle =\frac{1}{\pi}|\langle n|\alpha\rangle|^2 =\frac{1}{\pi n!}|\langle 0|\widehat{a}^n|\alpha\rangle|^2 = \frac{|\alpha|^{2n}}{\pi n!} |\langle 0|\alpha\rangle|^2 ~.$$

=== Damped quantum harmonic oscillator ===
Consider the damped quantum harmonic oscillator with the following master equation,
$$\frac{d\widehat{\rho}}{dt} = i\omega_0 [\widehat{\rho},\widehat{a}^\dagger\widehat{a}] + \frac{\gamma}{2} \left(2\widehat{a}\widehat{\rho}\widehat{a}^\dagger - \widehat{a}^\dagger\widehat{a} \widehat{\rho} - \rho\widehat{a}^\dagger \widehat{a}\right) + \gamma \langle n \rangle \left(\widehat{a} \widehat{\rho} \widehat{a}^\dagger + \widehat{a}^\dagger\widehat{\rho}\widehat{a} - \widehat{a}^\dagger\widehat{a}\widehat{\rho}-\widehat{\rho} \widehat{a} \widehat{a}^\dagger\right).$$

This results in the Fokker–Planck equation,
$$\frac{\partial}{\partial t} \{W\mid P\mid Q\}(\alpha,\alpha^*,t) = \left[\left(\frac{\gamma}{2} + i\omega_0\right) \frac{\partial}{\partial \alpha}\alpha + \left(\frac{\gamma}{2} - i\omega_0\right)\frac{\partial}{\partial \alpha^*}\alpha^* + \gamma\left(\langle n \rangle + \kappa\right) \frac{\partial^2}{\partial\alpha\,\partial\alpha^*}\right] \{W\mid P\mid Q\}(\alpha,\alpha^*,t),$$
where κ = 0, 1/2, 1 for the P, W, and Q representations, respectively.

If the system is initially in the coherent state $|\alpha_0\rangle$, then this equation has the solution
$$\{W\mid P\mid Q\}(\alpha,\alpha^*,t) = \frac{1}{\pi \left[\kappa + \langle n \rangle\left(1-e^{-\gamma t}\right)\right]} \exp\left[-\frac{\left|\alpha-\alpha_0 e^{-\left(\frac{\gamma}{2} + i\omega_0\right) t}\right|^2}{\kappa + \langle n \rangle \left(1-e^{-\gamma t}\right)}\right]~.$$

=== Creation and annihilation operators ===
Consider simple operators of the form $O=\hat a^n \hat a^{\dagger m}$. Then the characteristic functions are
$$\begin{align}
\chi_Q(z,z^*)&=e^{-|z|^2} \chi_P(z,z^*), \\
\chi_W(z,z^*)&=e^{-|z|^2/2} \chi_P(z,z^*), \\
\chi_P(z,z^*)&=\pi \frac{\partial^{n+m}}{\partial (iz)^n\partial (iz^*)^m} \delta^2(z).
\end{align}$$
The corresponding quasiprobability distributions are
$$\begin{align}
Q(\alpha,\alpha^*) &=
\frac1\pi
\left.
\frac{\partial^{n+m}}{\partial (iz)^n\partial (iz^*)^m}
e^{-|z|^2} e^{iz\alpha+iz^*\alpha^*}
\right|_{z=z^*=0}, \\
W(\alpha,\alpha^*)&=
\left. \frac{1}\pi
\frac{\partial^{n+m}}{\partial (iz)^n\partial (iz^*)^m}
e^{-|z|^2/2} e^{iz\alpha+iz^*\alpha^*}
\right|_{z=z^*=0},\\
P(\alpha,\alpha^*) &=
\frac1\pi \alpha^n \alpha^{* m}.
\end{align}$$
Here $P$ has a particularly simple expression because of the optical equivalence theorem and $O$ being antinormally ordered. Analogous formulas can be derived when $O$ has different ordering.

For example, for $O=\hat a^2\hat a^\dagger$ these give
$$\begin{align}
W(\alpha,\alpha^*) &=
\frac1\pi(\alpha+\alpha^2\alpha^*),
\\
P(\alpha,\alpha^*) &=
\frac1\pi \alpha^2\alpha^*,
\\
Q(\alpha,\alpha^*) &=
\frac1\pi (2\alpha+\alpha^2\alpha^*).
\end{align}$$

== See also ==
- Krein space
- Exotic probability
