= Glauber–Sudarshan P representation =

Mathematical approach to quantum optics

The Glauber–Sudarshan P representation is a suggested way of writing down the phase space distribution of a quantum system in the phase space formulation of quantum mechanics. The P representation is the quasiprobability distribution in which observables are expressed in normal order. In quantum optics, this representation, formally equivalent to several other representations, is sometimes preferred over such alternative representations to describe light in optical phase space, because typical optical observables, such as the particle number operator, are naturally expressed in normal order. It is named after George Sudarshan and Roy J. Glauber, who worked on the topic in 1963. Despite many useful applications in laser theory and coherence theory, the Sudarshan–Glauber P representation has the peculiarity that it is not always positive, and is not a bona-fide probability function.

== Definition ==
We wish to construct a function $P(\alpha)$ with the property that the density matrix $\hat{\rho}$ is diagonal in the basis of coherent states $\{|\alpha\rangle\}$, i.e.,

$$\hat{\rho} = \int P(\alpha) |{\alpha}\rangle \langle {\alpha}|\, d^{2}\alpha, \qquad d^2\alpha \equiv d\, {\rm Re}(\alpha) \, d\, {\rm Im}(\alpha).$$

We also wish to construct the function such that the expectation value of a normally ordered operator satisfies the optical equivalence theorem. This implies that the density matrix should be in anti-normal order so that we can express the density matrix as a power series

$$\hat{\rho}_A=\sum_{j,k} c_{j,k}\cdot\hat{a}^j\hat{a}^{\dagger k}.$$

Inserting the resolution of the identity

$$\hat{I}=\frac{1}{\pi} \int |{\alpha}\rangle \langle {\alpha}|\, d^{2}\alpha ,$$

we see that

$$\begin{align}
\rho_A(\hat{a},\hat{a}^{\dagger})&=\frac{1}{\pi}\sum_{j,k} \int c_{j,k}\cdot\hat{a}^j|{\alpha}\rangle \langle {\alpha}|\hat{a}^{\dagger k} \, d^{2}\alpha \\
&= \frac{1}{\pi} \sum_{j,k} \int c_{j,k} \cdot \alpha^j|{\alpha}\rangle \langle {\alpha}|\alpha^{*k} \, d^{2}\alpha \\
&= \frac{1}{\pi} \int \sum_{j,k} c_{j,k} \cdot \alpha^j\alpha^{*k}|{\alpha}\rangle \langle {\alpha}| \, d^{2}\alpha \\
&= \frac{1}{\pi} \int \rho_A(\alpha,\alpha^*)|{\alpha}\rangle \langle {\alpha}| \, d^{2}\alpha,\end{align}$$

and thus we formally assign

$$P(\alpha)=\frac{1}{\pi}\rho_A(\alpha,\alpha^*).$$

More useful integral formulas for P are necessary for any practical calculation. One method is to define the characteristic function

$$\chi_N(\beta)=\operatorname{tr}(\hat{\rho} \cdot e^{i\beta\cdot\hat{a}^{\dagger}}e^{i\beta^*\cdot\hat{a}})$$

and then take the Fourier transform

$$P(\alpha)=\frac{1}{\pi^2}\int \chi_N(\beta) e^{-\beta\alpha^*+\beta^*\alpha} \, d^2\beta.$$

Another useful integral formula for P is

$$P(\alpha)=\frac{e^{|\alpha|^2}}{\pi^2}\int \langle -\beta|\hat{\rho}|\beta\rangle e^{|\beta|^2-\beta\alpha^*+\beta^*\alpha} \, d^2\beta.$$

Note that both of these integral formulas do not converge in any usual sense for "typical" systems. We may also use the matrix elements of $\hat{\rho}$ in the Fock basis $\{|n\rangle\}$. The following formula shows that it is always possible to write the density matrix in this diagonal form without appealing to operator orderings using the inversion (given here for a single mode),

$$P(\alpha)=\sum_{n} \sum_{k} \langle n|\hat{\rho}|k\rangle \frac{\sqrt{n! k!}}{2 \pi r (n+k)!} e^{r^2-i(n-k)\theta} \left[\left( - \frac{\partial}{\partial r} \right)^{n+k} \delta (r) \right],$$

where r and θ are the amplitude and phase of α. Though this is a full formal solution of this possibility, it requires infinitely many derivatives of Dirac delta functions, far beyond the reach of any ordinary tempered distribution theory.

== Discussion ==
If the quantum system has a classical analog, e.g. a coherent state or thermal radiation, then P is non-negative everywhere like an ordinary probability distribution. If, however, the quantum system has no classical analog, e.g. an incoherent Fock state or entangled system, then P is negative somewhere or more singular than a Dirac delta function. (By a theorem of Schwartz, distributions that are more singular than the Dirac delta function are always negative somewhere.) Such "negative probability" or high degree of singularity is a feature inherent to the representation and does not diminish the meaningfulness of expectation values taken with respect to P. Even if P does behave like an ordinary probability distribution, however, the matter is not quite so simple. According to Mandel and Wolf: "The different coherent states are not [mutually] orthogonal, so that even if $P(\alpha)$ behaved like a true probability density [function], it would not describe probabilities of mutually exclusive states."

== Examples ==
=== Fock states ===
Fock states, $|\psi\rangle=|n\rangle$ for integer $n$, correspond to a highly singular P distribution, which can be written as
$$P_n(\alpha,\alpha^*)=\frac{e^{|\alpha|^2}}{n!} \frac{\partial^{2n}}{\partial\alpha^{*n}\,\partial\alpha^n} \delta^2(\alpha).$$
While this is not a function, this expression corresponds to a tempered distribution. In particular for the vacuum state $|0\rangle$ the P distribution is a Dirac delta function at the origin, as $P_0(\alpha,\alpha^*)=e^{|\alpha|^2} \delta^2(\alpha)=\delta^2(\alpha)$. Similarly, the Fock state $|1\rangle$ gives
$$P_1(\alpha,\alpha^*) = e^{|\alpha|^2}\frac{\partial^2}{\partial\alpha\partial\alpha^*} \delta^2(\alpha)
= \delta^2(\alpha) + \frac{\partial^2}{\partial\alpha\partial\alpha^*} \delta^2(\alpha).$$
We can also easily verify that the above expression for $P_n$ works more generally observing that
$$\int \mathrm d^2\alpha \left(\frac{e^{|\alpha|^2}}{n!}\frac{\partial^{2n}}{\partial\alpha^n\partial\alpha^{*n}}\delta^2(\alpha)\right)
|\alpha\rangle\!\langle\alpha|
=\sum_{j,k=0}^\infty \frac{|j\rangle\!\langle k|}{n!\sqrt{j!k!}}
\int \mathrm d^2\alpha \left(\frac{\partial^{2n}}{\partial\alpha^n\partial\alpha^{*n}}\delta^2(\alpha)\right) \alpha^j \alpha^{*k},$$
together with the identity
$$\int \mathrm d^2\alpha \left(\frac{\partial^{2n}}{\partial\alpha^n\partial\alpha^{*n}}\delta^2(\alpha)\right) \alpha^j \alpha^{*k}
= \left.\frac{\partial^{2n}}{\partial\alpha^n\partial\alpha^{*n}}(\alpha^j \alpha^{*k})\right\vert_{\alpha=0}
= n!^2 \delta_{j,n}\delta_{k,n}.$$
The same reasoning can be used to show more generally that the P function of the operators $|n\rangle\!\langle m|$ is given by
$$P_{n,m}(\alpha,\alpha^*)
= (-1)^{n+m}\frac{e^{|\alpha|^2}}{\sqrt{n!m!}} \frac{\partial^{n+m}}{\partial\alpha^n\partial\alpha^{*m}}\delta^2(\alpha).$$

Another concise formal expression for the P function of Fock states using the Laguerre polynomials is
$$P_n(\alpha,\alpha^*) = L_n(-\frac14\partial_\alpha\partial_{\alpha^*} ) \delta^2(\alpha).$$

=== Thermal radiation ===
From statistical mechanics arguments in the Fock basis, the mean photon number of a mode with wavevector k and polarization state s for a black body at temperature T is known to be

$$\langle\hat{n}_{\mathbf{k},s}\rangle=\frac{1}{e^{\hbar \omega / k_B T}-1}.$$

The P representation of the black body is

$$P(\{\alpha_{\mathbf{k},s}\})=\prod_{\mathbf{k},s} \frac{1}{\pi \langle\hat{n}_{\mathbf{k},s}\rangle} e^{-|\alpha|^2 / \langle\hat{n}_{\mathbf{k},s}\rangle}.$$

In other words, every mode of the black body is normally distributed in the basis of coherent states. Since P is positive and bounded, this system is essentially classical. This is actually quite a remarkable result because for thermal equilibrium the density matrix is also diagonal in the Fock basis, but Fock states are non-classical.

=== Highly singular example ===
Even very simple-looking states may exhibit highly non-classical behavior. Consider a superposition of two coherent states

$$|\psi\rangle=c_0|\alpha_0\rangle+c_1|\alpha_1\rangle$$

where c_{0} , c_{1} are constants subject to the normalizing constraint

$$1=|c_0|^2+|c_1|^2+2e^{-(|\alpha_0|^2+|\alpha_1|^2)/2}\operatorname{Re}\left( c_0^*c_1 e^{\alpha_0^*\alpha_1} \right).$$

Note that this is quite different from a qubit because $|\alpha_0\rangle$ and $|\alpha_1\rangle$ are not orthogonal. As it is straightforward to calculate $\langle -\alpha|\hat{\rho}|\alpha\rangle=\langle -\alpha|\psi\rangle\langle\psi|\alpha\rangle$, we can use the Mehta formula above to compute P,

$$\begin{align}P(\alpha)= {} & |c_0|^2\delta^2(\alpha-\alpha_0)+|c_1|^2\delta^2(\alpha-\alpha_1) \\[5pt]
& {} +2c_0^*c_1
e^{|\alpha|^2-\frac{1}{2}|\alpha_0|^2-\frac{1}{2}|\alpha_1|^2}
e^{(\alpha_1^*-\alpha_0^*)\cdot\partial/\partial(2\alpha^*-\alpha_0^*-\alpha_1^*)}
e^{(\alpha_0-\alpha_1)\cdot\partial/\partial(2\alpha-\alpha_0-\alpha_1)}
\cdot \delta^2(2\alpha-\alpha_0-\alpha_1) \\[5pt]
& {} +2c_0c_1^*
e^{|\alpha|^2-\frac{1}{2}|\alpha_0|^2-\frac{1}{2}|\alpha_1|^2}
e^{(\alpha_0^*-\alpha_1^*)\cdot\partial/\partial(2\alpha^*-\alpha_0^*-\alpha_1^*)}
e^{(\alpha_1-\alpha_0)\cdot\partial/\partial(2\alpha-\alpha_0-\alpha_1)}
\cdot \delta^2(2\alpha-\alpha_0-\alpha_1).
\end{align}$$

Despite having infinitely many derivatives of delta functions, P still obeys the optical equivalence theorem. If the expectation value of the number operator, for example, is taken with respect to the state vector or as a phase space average with respect to P, the two expectation values match:

$$\begin{align}\langle\psi|\hat{n}|\psi\rangle&=\int P(\alpha) |\alpha|^2 \, d^2\alpha \\
&=|c_0\alpha_0|^2+|c_1\alpha_1|^2+2e^{-(|\alpha_0|^2+|\alpha_1|^2)/2}\operatorname{Re}\left( c_0^*c_1 \alpha_0^*\alpha_1 e^{\alpha_0^*\alpha_1} \right).\end{align}$$

== See also ==
- Quasiprobability distribution § Characteristic functions
- Nonclassical light
- Wigner quasiprobability distribution
- Husimi Q representation
- Nobel Prize controversies
