= Optical equivalence theorem =

The optical equivalence theorem in quantum optics asserts an equivalence between the expectation value of an operator in Hilbert space and the expectation value of its associated function in the phase space formulation with respect to a quasiprobability distribution. The theorem was first reported by George Sudarshan in 1963 for normally ordered operators and generalized later that decade to any ordering.

Let Ω be an ordering of the non-commutative creation and annihilation operators, and let $g_{\Omega}(\hat{a},\hat{a}^{\dagger})$ be an operator that is expressible as a power series in the creation and annihilation operators that satisfies the ordering Ω. Then the optical equivalence theorem is succinctly expressed as

$\langle g_{\Omega}(\hat{a},\hat{a}^{\dagger}) \rangle = \langle g_{\Omega}(\alpha,\alpha^*) \rangle.$

Here, α is understood to be the eigenvalue of the annihilation operator on a coherent states and is replaced formally in the power series expansion of g. The left side of the above equation is an expectation value in the Hilbert space whereas the right hand side is an expectation value with respect to the quasiprobability distribution.

We may write each of these explicitly for better clarity. Let $\hat{\rho}$ be the density operator and ${\bar{\Omega}}$ be the ordering reciprocal to Ω. The quasiprobability distribution associated with Ω is given, then, at least formally, by

$$\hat{\rho} = \frac{1}{\pi} \int f_{\bar{\Omega}}(\alpha,\alpha^*) |\alpha\rangle\langle\alpha| \, d^2\alpha.$$

The above framed equation becomes

$$\operatorname{tr}( \hat{\rho} \cdot g_\Omega(\hat{a},\hat{a}^\dagger)) = \int f_{\bar\Omega}(\alpha,\alpha^*) g_\Omega(\alpha,\alpha^*) \, d^2\alpha.$$

For example, let Ω be the normal order. This means that g can be written in a power series of the following form:

$$g_N(\hat{a}^\dagger, \hat{a}) = \sum_{n,m} c_{nm} \hat{a}^{\dagger n} \hat{a}^m.$$

The quasiprobability distribution associated with the normal order is the Glauber–Sudarshan P representation. In these terms, we arrive at

$$\operatorname{tr}( \hat{\rho} \cdot g_N(\hat{a},\hat{a}^\dagger)) = \int P(\alpha) g(\alpha,\alpha^*) \, d^2\alpha.$$

This theorem implies the formal equivalence between expectation values of normally ordered operators in quantum optics and the corresponding complex numbers in classical optics.
