= Fock space =

Multi particle state space

The Fock space is an algebraic construction used in quantum mechanics to construct the quantum states space of a variable or unknown number of identical particles from a single particle Hilbert space. It is named after V. A. Fock, who first introduced it in his 1932 paper "Konfigurationsraum und zweite Quantelung" ("Configuration space and second quantization").

Informally, a Fock space is the sum of a set of Hilbert spaces representing zero-particle states, one-particle states, two-particle states, and so on. If the identical particles are bosons, then the n-particle states are vectors in a symmetrized tensor product of n single-particle Hilbert spaces. If the identical particles are fermions, then the n-particle states are vectors in an antisymmetrized tensor product of n single-particle Hilbert spaces (see symmetric algebra and exterior algebra respectively). A general state in Fock space is a linear combination of n-particle states, one for each n.

Technically, the Fock space is (the Hilbert space completion of) the direct sum of the symmetric or antisymmetric tensors in the tensor powers of a single-particle Hilbert space H,

$$F_\nu(H)=\overline{\bigoplus_{n=0}^{\infty}S_\nu H^{\otimes n}}.$$

Here, $S_\nu$ is the operator that symmetrizes or antisymmetrizes a tensor, depending on whether the Hilbert space describes particles obeying bosonic $(\nu = +)$ or fermionic $(\nu = -)$ statistics, and the overline represents the completion of the space. The bosonic (or fermionic) Fock space can alternatively be constructed as (the Hilbert space completion of) the symmetric tensors $F_+(H) = \overline{S^*H}$ (or alternating tensors $F_-(H) = \overline{ {\bigwedge}^* H}$). For every basis of H, there is a natural basis of the Fock space, the Fock states.

== Definition ==
The Fock space is the (Hilbert) direct sum of tensor products of copies of a single-particle Hilbert space $H$:

$$F_\nu(H)=\bigoplus_{n=0}^{\infty}S_\nu H^{\otimes n} = \Complex \oplus H \oplus \left(S_\nu \left(H \otimes H\right)\right) \oplus \left(S_\nu \left( H \otimes H \otimes H\right)\right) \oplus \cdots$$

Here $\Complex$, the complex scalars, consists of the states corresponding to no particles, $H$ the states of one particle, $S_\nu (H\otimes H)$ the states of two identical particles, and so on.

A general state in $F_\nu(H)$ is given by

$$|\Psi\rangle_\nu= |\Psi_0\rangle_\nu \oplus |\Psi_1\rangle_\nu \oplus |\Psi_2\rangle_\nu \oplus \cdots = a |0\rangle \oplus \sum_i a_i|\psi_i\rangle \oplus \sum_{ij} a_{ij}|\psi_i, \psi_j \rangle_\nu \oplus \cdots,$$

where

- $|0\rangle$ is a vector of length 1 called the vacuum state and $a \in \Complex$ is a complex coefficient,
- $|\psi_i\rangle \in H$ is a state in the single particle Hilbert space and $a_i \in \Complex$ is a complex coefficient,
- $|\psi_i , \psi_j \rangle_\nu = a_{ij} |\psi_i\rangle \otimes|\psi_j\rangle + a_{ji} |\psi_j\rangle\otimes|\psi_i\rangle \in S_\nu(H \otimes H)$, and $a_{ij} = \nu a_{ji} \in \Complex$ is a complex coefficient, etc.

The convergence of this infinite sum is important if $F_\nu(H)$ is to be a Hilbert space. Technically we require $F_\nu(H)$ to be the Hilbert space completion of the algebraic direct sum. It consists of all infinite tuples $|\Psi\rangle_\nu = (|\Psi_0\rangle_\nu , |\Psi_1\rangle_\nu , |\Psi_2\rangle_\nu, \ldots)$ such that the norm

$$\| |\Psi\rangle_\nu \|_\nu^2 = \sum_{n=0}^\infty \langle \Psi_n |\Psi_n \rangle_\nu < \infty$$

is finite, where the $n$ particle norm is defined by

$$\langle \Psi_n | \Psi_n \rangle_\nu = \sum_{i_1,\ldots i_n} \sum_{j_1, \ldots j_n} a_{i_1,\ldots, i_n}^* a_{j_1, \ldots, j_n} \langle \psi_{i_1}| \psi_{j_1} \rangle\cdots \langle \psi_{i_n}| \psi_{j_n} \rangle,$$

i.e., the restriction of the norm on the tensor product $H^{\otimes n}$.

For two general states

$$|\Psi\rangle_\nu= |\Psi_0\rangle_\nu \oplus |\Psi_1\rangle_\nu \oplus |\Psi_2\rangle_\nu \oplus \cdots = a |0\rangle \oplus \sum_i a_i|\psi_i\rangle \oplus \sum_{ij} a_{ij}|\psi_i, \psi_j \rangle_\nu \oplus \cdots$$

and

$$|\Phi\rangle_\nu=|\Phi_0\rangle_\nu \oplus |\Phi_1\rangle_\nu \oplus |\Phi_2\rangle_\nu \oplus \cdots = b |0\rangle \oplus \sum_i b_i |\phi_i\rangle \oplus \sum_{ij} b_{ij}|\phi_i, \phi_j \rangle_\nu \oplus \cdots,$$

the inner product on $F_\nu(H)$ is then defined as

$$\langle \Psi |\Phi\rangle_\nu := \sum_n \langle \Psi_n| \Phi_n \rangle_\nu = a^* b + \sum_{ij} a_i^* b_j\langle\psi_i | \phi_j \rangle +\sum_{ijkl}a_{ij}^*b_{kl}\langle \psi_i|\phi_k\rangle\langle\psi_j| \phi_l \rangle_\nu + \cdots,$$

where we use the inner products on each of the $n$-particle Hilbert spaces. In particular, the $n$-particle subspaces are orthogonal for different $n$.

== Product states, indistinguishable particles, and a useful basis for Fock space ==
A product state of the Fock space is a state of the form

$$|\Psi\rangle_\nu=|\phi_1,\phi_2,\cdots,\phi_n\rangle_\nu = |\phi_1\rangle \otimes |\phi_2\rangle \otimes \cdots \otimes |\phi_n\rangle,$$

which describes a collection of $n$ particles, one of which has quantum state $\phi_1$, another $\phi_2$, and so on up to the $n$th particle, where each $\phi_i$ is any state from the single-particle Hilbert space $H$. Here, juxtaposition (writing the single-particle kets side by side, without the $\otimes$) is symmetric (resp. antisymmetric) multiplication in the symmetric (antisymmetric) tensor algebra. The general state in a Fock space is a linear combination of product states. A state that cannot be written as a convex sum of product states is called an entangled state.

When we speak of one particle in state $\phi_i$, we must bear in mind that in quantum mechanics identical particles are indistinguishable. In the same Fock space, all particles are identical. (To describe many species of particles, we take the tensor product of as many different Fock spaces as there are species of particles under consideration). It is one of the most powerful features of this formalism that states are implicitly properly symmetrized. For instance, if the above state $|\Psi\rangle_-$ is fermionic, it will be 0 if two (or more) of the $\phi_i$ are equal because the antisymmetric (exterior) product $|\phi_i \rangle |\phi_i \rangle = 0$. This is a mathematical formulation of the Pauli exclusion principle that no two (or more) fermions can be in the same quantum state. In fact, whenever the terms in a formal product are linearly dependent; the product will be zero for antisymmetric tensors. Also, the product of orthonormal states is properly orthonormal by construction (although possibly 0 in the Fermi case when two states are equal).

A useful and convenient basis for a Fock space is the occupancy number basis. Given a basis $\{|\psi_i\rangle\}_{i = 0,1,2, \dots}$ of $H$, we can denote the state with $n_0$ particles in state $|\psi_0\rangle$, $n_1$ particles in state $|\psi_1\rangle$, ..., $n_k$ particles in state $|\psi_k\rangle$, and no particles in the remaining states, by defining

$$|n_0,n_1,\ldots,n_k\rangle_\nu = |\psi_0\rangle^{n_0}|\psi_1\rangle^{n_1} \cdots |\psi_k\rangle^{n_k},$$

where each $n_i$ takes the value 0 or 1 for fermionic particles and 0, 1, 2, ... for bosonic particles. Trailing zeroes may be dropped without changing the state. Such a state is called a Fock state. When the $|\psi_i\rangle$ are understood as the steady states of a free field, the Fock states describe an assembly of non-interacting particles in definite numbers. The most general Fock state is a linear superposition of pure states.

Two operators of great importance are the creation and annihilation operators, which upon acting on a Fock state add or respectively remove a particle in the ascribed quantum state. They are denoted $a^{\dagger}(\phi)\,$ for creation and $a(\phi)$ for annihilation, respectively. To create ("add") a particle, the quantum state $|\phi\rangle$ is symmetric- or exterior-multiplied with $|\phi\rangle$, and to annihilate ("remove") a particle, an (even or odd) interior product is taken with $\langle\phi|$, which is the adjoint of $a^\dagger(\phi)$. It is often convenient to work with states of the basis of $H$ so that these operators remove and add exactly one particle in the given basis state. These operators also serve as generators for more general operators acting on the Fock space; for instance, the number operator giving the number of particles in a specific state $|\phi_i\rangle$ is $a^{\dagger}(\phi_i)a(\phi_i)$.

== Wave function interpretation ==
Often the one-particle space $H$ is given as $L_2(X, \mu)$, the space of square-integrable functions on a space $X$ with measure $\mu$ (strictly speaking, the equivalence classes of square-integrable functions where functions are equivalent if they differ on a set of measure zero). The typical example is the free particle with $H = L_2(\R^3, d^3x)$ the space of square-integrable functions on three-dimensional space. The Fock spaces then have a natural interpretation as symmetric or antisymmetric square-integrable functions as follows.

Let $X^0 = \{*\}$ and $X^1 = X$, $X^2 = X\times X$, $X^3 = X \times X \times X$, etc. Consider the space of tuples of points which is the disjoint union

$$X^* = X^0 \amalg X^1 \amalg X^2 \amalg X^3 \amalg \cdots .$$

It has a natural measure $\mu^*$ such that $\mu^*(X^0) = 1$ and the restriction of $\mu^*$ to $X^n$ is $\mu^n$. The even Fock space $F_+(L_2(X,\mu))$ can then be identified with the space of symmetric functions in $L_2(X^*, \mu^*)$, whereas the odd Fock space $F_-(L_2(X,\mu))$ can be identified with the space of antisymmetric functions. The identification follows directly from the isometric mapping

$$L_2(X, \mu)^{\otimes n} \to L_2(X^n, \mu^n)$$

$$\psi_1(x)\otimes\cdots\otimes\psi_n(x) \mapsto \psi_1(x_1)\cdots \psi_n(x_n).$$

Given wave functions $\psi_1(x), \ldots , \psi_n(x)$, the Slater determinant

$$\Psi(x_1, \ldots x_n) = \frac{1}{\sqrt{n!}} \begin{vmatrix}
\psi_1(x_1) & \cdots & \psi_n(x_1) \\
\vdots      & \ddots & \vdots      \\
\psi_1(x_n) & \cdots & \psi_n(x_n) \\
\end{vmatrix}$$

is an antisymmetric function on $X^n$. It can thus be naturally interpreted as an element of the $n$-particle sector of the odd Fock space. The normalization is chosen such that $\|\Psi\| = 1$ if the functions $\psi_1, \ldots, \psi_n$ are orthonormal. There is a similar "Slater permanent" with the determinant replaced with the permanent, which gives elements of $n$-sector of the even Fock space.

== Representation theory ==
In representation theory, Fock spaces can be described as cyclic modules generated by a distinguished vector, the vacuum. Annihilation operators kill the vacuum, while repeated application of creation operators generates the remaining basis vectors. Thus a Fock space may be viewed as a representation space for algebras generated by creation and annihilation operators. For bosons, the symmetric Fock space gives the standard Fock representation of the canonical commutation relations, or equivalently of the Weyl algebra. For fermions, the antisymmetric Fock space gives the corresponding representation of the canonical anticommutation relations, equivalently of a Clifford algebra. The vacuum vector is cyclic in both cases.

In the bosonic case, for a finite-dimensional one-particle space, the canonical commutation relations define a Heisenberg algebra generated by the creation and annihilation operators together with a central element, which acts as the identity in the usual Fock representation. The corresponding Weyl algebra is the quotient of the universal enveloping algebra of this Heisenberg algebra by the relation that the central element acts as $1$. Quadratic expressions in the creation and annihilation operators close under commutator and give a representation of the symplectic Lie algebra $\mathfrak{sp}(2n)$. At the group level this is the oscillator, or metaplectic representation.

The bosonic Fock space is irreducible as the standard representation of the Heisenberg or Weyl algebra, but decomposes into even and odd irreducible components under the quadratic action of $\mathfrak{sp}(2n)$. With the usual highest-weight convention for $\mathfrak{sp}(2n)$, these two components have highest weights $-\frac12\omega_n$ and $\omega_{n-1}-\frac32\omega_n$, where $\omega_1,\ldots,\omega_n$ are the fundamental weights of the type-$C_n$ root system. In the standard coordinates $\varepsilon_i$ on a Cartan subalgebra, these fundamental weights are $\omega_k=\varepsilon_1+\cdots+\varepsilon_k$. Equivalently, in the holomorphic Fock model, the two components may be viewed, depending on the choice of positive roots, as modules generated by the even and odd vacuum sectors.

In the fermionic case, the relation with spin representations is obtained by choosing a polarization of a quadratic space. If $U$ is a finite-dimensional one-particle space, form the quadratic space $U\oplus U^\ast$, with symmetric bilinear form given by the natural pairing between $U$ and $U^\ast$. The two summands are complementary maximal isotropic subspaces. The fermionic Fock space $\Lambda^\ast U$ is then the spinor module associated with this polarization: elements of $U$ act by exterior multiplication, while elements of $U^\ast$ act by contraction. These operations satisfy the canonical anticommutation relations and hence give the standard action of the Clifford algebra $\mathrm{Cl}(U\oplus U^\ast)$ on $\Lambda^\ast U$.

Quadratic expressions in the fermionic creation and annihilation operators generate an action of an orthogonal Lie algebra. For $\mathfrak{so}(2n)$, where $2n=\dim(U\oplus U^\ast)$, the even and odd parts $\Lambda^{\mathrm{even}}U$ and $\Lambda^{\mathrm{odd}}U$ give the two half-spin representations. With one additional Clifford generator, the full space $\Lambda^\ast U$ gives the spin representation of $\mathfrak{so}(2n+1)$.

Fock space constructions also occur for infinite-dimensional algebras. Fermionic Fock space can be realized as a semi-infinite exterior algebra and used to construct representations of infinite-rank matrix algebras and affine Lie algebras. Bosonic Fock spaces similarly appear as modules for Heisenberg algebras and in the construction of vertex algebras. The boson–fermion correspondence identifies certain bosonic and fermionic Fock representations and is a central example of the role of Fock space in representation theory.

== Relation to the Segal–Bargmann space ==
Define the Segal–Bargmann space $B_N$ of complex holomorphic functions square-integrable with respect to a Gaussian measure:

$$\mathcal{F}^2\left(\Complex^N\right) = \left\{ f\colon\Complex^N\to\Complex \mid \Vert f\Vert_{\mathcal{F}^2(\Complex^N)} < \infty\right\},$$
where
$$\Vert f\Vert_{\mathcal{F}^2(\Complex^N)} := \int_{\Complex^N}\vert f(\mathbf{z})\vert^2 e^{-\pi\vert \mathbf{z}\vert^2}\,d\mathbf{z}.$$
Then defining a space $B_\infty$ as the nested union of the spaces $B_N$ over the integers $N \ge 0$, Segal and Bargmann showed that $B_\infty$ is isomorphic to a bosonic Fock space. The monomial
$$x_1^{n_1}...x_k^{n_k}$$
corresponds to the Fock state
$$|n_0,n_1,\ldots,n_k\rangle_\nu = |\psi_0\rangle^{n_0}|\psi_1\rangle^{n_1} \cdots |\psi_k\rangle^{n_k}.$$

== See also ==
- Fock state
- Tensor algebra
- Holomorphic Fock space
- Creation and annihilation operators
- Slater determinant
- Wick's theorem
- Noncommutative geometry
- Grand canonical ensemble, thermal distribution over Fock space
- Schrödinger functional
