= Exotic probability =

Extension of probability theory

Exotic probability is a branch of probability theory that deals with probabilities which are outside the normal range of [0, 1].

According to the author of various papers on exotic probability, Saul Youssef, the valid possible alternatives for probability values are the real numbers, the complex numbers and the quaternions. Youssef also cites the work of Richard Feynman, P. A. M. Dirac, Stanley Gudder and S. K. Srinivasan as relevant to exotic probability theories.

Of the application of such theories to quantum mechanics, Bill Jefferys has said: "Such approaches are also not necessary and in my opinion they confuse more than they illuminate."

== See also ==
- Negative probability
- Signed measure
- Complex measure
- Quasiprobability distribution
