= E. C. George Sudarshan =

Indian-American theoretical physicist

George Sudarshan
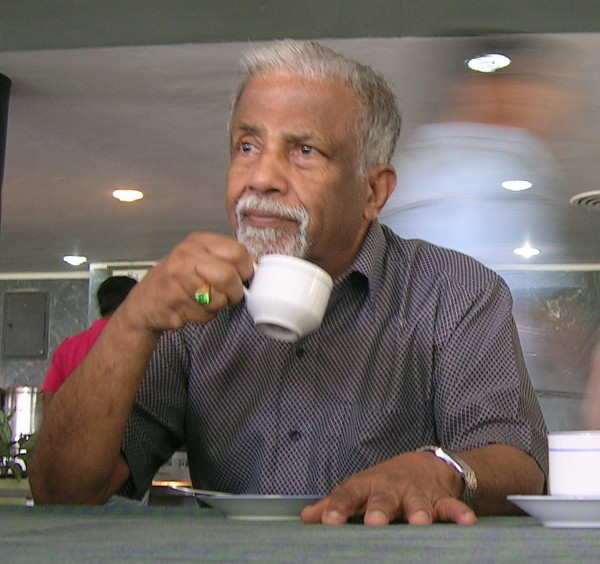
- E. C. G. Sudarshan at TIFR Mumbai in 2009
- Born: 16 September 1931; Pallom, Travancore, British India
- Died: 13 May 2018 (aged 86); Austin, Texas, United States
- Education: CMS College Kottayam; Madras Christian College; University of Madras; University of Rochester
- Known for: Coherent states Optical equivalence theorem Glauber–Sudarshan representation GKSL equation V-A theory Tachyon; No-interaction theorem Quantum Zeno effect Open quantum system Spin–statistics theorem
- Spouses: Lalita Rau (m. 1954–1990) Bhamathi Gopalakrishnan (m. 1990)
- Children: 3
- Parents: Ipe Chandy (father); Achamma (mother)
- Awards: 2010 ICTP Dirac Medal; 2007 Padma Vibhushan; 2006 Majorana Prize; 1985 TWAS Prize; 1977 Bose Medal; 1976 Padma Bhushan; 1970 C. V. Raman Award
- Scientific career
- Fields: Theoretical physics
- Workplaces: University of Texas at Austin; Syracuse University; Indian Institute of Science; Institute of Mathematical Sciences, Chennai; Harvard University; University of Rochester; Tata Institute of Fundamental Research
- Doctoral advisor: Robert Marshak
- Doctoral students: Mohammad Aslam Khan Khalil; Narasimhaiengar Mukunda
- Other notable students: Staffan Ström

Ennackal Chandy George Sudarshan (also known as E. C. G. Sudarshan; 16 September 1931 – 13 May 2018) was an Indian American theoretical physicist and a professor at the University of Texas. Sudarshan has been credited with numerous contributions to the field of theoretical physics, including Glauber–Sudarshan P representation, V-A theory, tachyons, quantum Zeno effect, open quantum system and quantum master equations, spin–statistics theorem, non-invariance groups, positive maps of density matrices, and quantum computation.

== Early life ==
Ennackal Chandy George Sudarshan was born in Pallom, Kottayam, Travancore, British India. He was raised in a Syrian Christian family, but later left the religion and converted to Hinduism following his marriage. He married Lalita Rau on 20 December 1954, and they have three sons, Alexander, Arvind (deceased) and Ashok. George and Lalita were divorced in 1990 and he married Bhamathi Gopalakrishnan in Austin, Texas.

He studied at CMS College Kottayam, and graduated with honors from the Madras Christian College in 1951. Sudarshan obtained his master's degree at the University of Madras in 1952. He moved to Tata Institute of Fundamental Research (TIFR) and worked there for a brief period with Dr. Homi Bhabha as well as others. Subsequently, he moved to University of Rochester in New York to work under Prof. Robert Marshak as a graduate student. In 1958, he received his Ph.D. degree from the University of Rochester. At this point he moved to Harvard University to join Prof. Julian Schwinger as a postdoctoral fellow.

== Career ==
Sudarshan made significant contributions to several areas of physics. He was the originator (with Robert Marshak) of the V-A theory of the weak force (later propagated by Richard Feynman and Murray Gell-Mann), which eventually paved the way for the electroweak theory. Feynman acknowledged Sudarshan's contribution in 1963 stating that the V-A theory was discovered by Sudarshan and Marshak and publicized by Gell-Mann and himself. He also developed a quantum representation of coherent light later known as Glauber–Sudarshan representation (for which controversially Glauber was awarded the 2005 Nobel prize in Physics ignoring Sudarshan's contributions).

In 1963, Douglas G. Currie, Thomas F. Jordan, and Sudarshan introduced the no-interaction theorem. proving the necessity of fields in physics.

Sudarshan's most significant work may have been his contribution to the field of quantum optics. His theorem proves the equivalence of classical wave optics to quantum optics. The theorem makes use of the Sudarshan representation. This representation also predicts optical effects that are purely quantum, and cannot be explained classically. Sudarshan was also an advocate for the existence of tachyons, particles that travel faster than light. He developed a fundamental formalism called dynamical maps to study the theory of open quantum system. He, in collaboration with Baidyanath Misra, also proposed the quantum Zeno effect.

Sudarshan and collaborators initiated the "Quantum theory of charged-particle beam optics", by working out the focusing action of a magnetic quadrupole using the Dirac equation.

He taught at the Tata Institute of Fundamental Research (TIFR), University of Rochester, Syracuse University, and Harvard. From 1969 onwards, he was a professor of physics at the University of Texas at Austin and a senior professor at the Indian Institute of Science. He worked as the director of the Institute of Mathematical Sciences (IMSc), Chennai, India, for five years during the 1980s dividing his time between India and USA. During his tenure, he transformed it into a centre of excellence. He also met and held many discussions with philosopher J. Krishnamurti. He was felicitated on his 80th birthday, at IMSc Chennai on 16 September 2011. His areas of interest included elementary particle physics, quantum optics, quantum information, quantum field theory, gauge field theories, classical mechanics and foundations of physics. He was also deeply interested in Vedanta, on which he lectured frequently.

== Controversy regarding Nobel Prize ==
Sudarshan began working on quantum optics at the University of Rochester in 1960. Two years later, Glauber criticized the use of classical electromagnetic theory in explaining optical fields, which surprised Sudarshan because he believed the theory provided accurate explanations. Sudarshan subsequently wrote a paper expressing his ideas and sent a preprint to Glauber. Glauber informed Sudarshan of similar results and asked to be acknowledged in the latter's paper, while criticizing Sudarshan in his own paper. "Glauber criticized Sudarshan's representation, but his own was unable to generate any of the typical quantum optics phenomena, hence he introduces what he calls a P-representation, which was Sudarshan's representation by another name", wrote a physicist. "This representation, which had at first been scorned by Glauber, later becomes known as the Glauber–Sudarshan representation."

Sudarshan was passed over for the Physics Nobel Prize on more than one occasion, leading to controversy in 2005 when several physicists wrote to the Swedish Academy, protesting that Sudarshan should have been awarded a share of the Prize for the Sudarshan diagonal representation (also known as Glauber–Sudarshan representation) in quantum optics, for which Roy J. Glauber won his share of the prize. Sudarshan and other physicists sent a letter to the Nobel Committee claiming that the P representation had more contributions of "Sudarshan" than "Glauber". The letter goes on to say that Glauber criticized Sudarshan's theory—before renaming it the "P representation" and incorporating it into his own work. In an unpublished letter to The New York Times, Sudarshan calls the "Glauber–Sudarshan representation" a misnomer, adding that "literally all subsequent theoretic developments in the field of Quantum Optics make use of" Sudarshan's work— essentially, asserting that he had developed the breakthrough.

In 2007, Sudarshan told the Hindustan Times, "The 2005 Nobel prize for Physics was awarded for my work, but I wasn't the one to get it. Each one of the discoveries that this Nobel was given for work based on my research." Sudarshan also commented on not being selected for the 1979 Nobel, "Steven Weinberg, Sheldon Glashow and Abdus Salam built on work I had done as a 26-year-old student. If you give a prize for a building, shouldn't the fellow who built the first floor be given the prize before those who built the second floor?"

== Awards ==
- Honorary doctorate by University of Kerala
- Kerala Sastra Puraskaram for lifetime accomplishments in science, 2013
- Dirac Medal of the ICTP, 2010
- Padma Vibhushan, second highest civilian award from the Government of India, 2007
- Majorana Prize, 2006
- Presidential Citation Award from the University of Texas at Austin, 2006
- The first TWAS Prize in Physics awarded by the World Academy of Sciences, 1985
- Bose Medal, 1977
- Padma Bhushan, third highest civilian award from the Government of India, 1976
- C. V. Raman Award, 1970

== Books ==
- 1961: (with Robert Marshak) Introduction to Elementary Particle Physics, Interscience Publishers, Google Books snippet view
- 1968: (with John R. Klauder) Fundamentals of Quantum Optics, Dover Books ISBN 0486450082 Google Books preview of 2006 edition
- 1974: (with N. Mukunda) Classical Dynamics: a modern perspective, World Scientific ISBN 9814730017 Google Books preview of 2015 edition
- 1998: (with Ian Duck) Pauli and the Spin–Statistics Theorem, World Scientific, ISBN 9814497452 Google Books preview
- 1999: (with Tony Rothman) Doubt and Certainty: The celebrated academy debates on science, mysticism, and reality, Basic Books ISBN 0738201693
- 2004: (with Giampiero Esposito and Giuseppe Marmo) From Classical to Quantum Mechanics: An Introduction to the Formalism, Foundations and Applications, Cambridge University Press ISBN 1139450549 Google Books preview
- 2014: (with Giampiero Esposito, Giuseppe Marmo, and Gennaro Miele) Advanced Concepts in Quantum Mechanics, Cambridge University Press ISBN 9781107076044

== See also ==
- Winners of Padma Bhushan
