= Narasimhaiengar Mukunda =

Indian physicist

- Born: 25 January 1939 (age 87); New Delhi India
- Education: (BSc) Delhi University; (PhD) University of Rochester
- Awards: Shanti Swarup Bhatnagar Prize
- Scientific career
- Workplaces: IISc Bangalore; Tata Institute of Fundamental Research IISER Bhopal IISER Mohali IISER Thiruvananthapuram
- Doctoral advisor: E. C. G. Sudarshan

Narasimhaiengar Mukunda (born 25 January 1939, New Delhi, India) is an Indian theoretical physicist who is known for his expertise in particle physics, mathematical Physics, mechanics and optics. His contributions to physics are many, prominent among them are representation theory of the Lorentz, Poincaré and other non-compact groups, Majorana and other relativistic wave equations, Fourier optics, Hamiltonian theories, quantum mechanics and optics classical dynamical formalism.

== Education ==
Mukunda's higher education began at Delhi University, where he graduated with B.Sc. (Hon) degree in 1953. For his Ph.D he studied at University of Rochester with E. C. G. Sudarshan and graduated in 1964. Mukunda’s thesis dealt with Hamiltonian mechanics, symmetry groups and elementary particles. He also studied group theory at Princeton University with Valentine Bargmann, including topological groups and Lie theory.

== Research career ==
He was a post-doctoral fellow at Syracuse University before he returned to India. In 1967, he became a Fellow at Tata Institute of Fundamental Research. In 1969 he transferred to IISc, Bangalore. From 1972 to 2001 he served as professor at the Center for Theoretical Studies. Using the notes from Bargmann's lectures, Mukunda contributed chapters on Lie groups to Classical Dynamics: a modern perspective that he authored with Sudarshan in 1974. The expression of symmetries on physics rests largely on Lie groups, and his later works exploit these classical groups for physical theory. Mukunda was particularly impressed by W. R. Hamilton's "theory of turns" (versors), and worked to extend the use of turns in Sp(2), SU(1,1) and the Lorentz group. In 1989 Mukunda, Rajiah Simon and Sudarshan published "Hamilton’s theory of turns and a new geometrical representation for polarization optics" which developed the coset space SU(2)/U(1) = S^{3}/S^{1} as an alternative to the Poincaré sphere in the description of light polarization.

Mukunda and collaborators initiated the "Quantum theory of charged-particle beam optics" in 1989 by working out the focusing action of a magnetic quadrupole using the Dirac Equation.

Mukunda is an honorary professor at IISER Bhopal, IISER Mohali and IISER Thiruvananthapuram. He is also the Distinguished associate of Ramakrishna Mission Vivekananda Educational and Research Institute.

== Awards ==
He was awarded the Shanti Swarup Bhatnagar Award, India's prestigious Scientist Award, in 1980 for his work in nonlinear and quantum optics. In 2016 Mukunda gave the Fifteenth Memorial V.G. Kulkarni Lecture: "The Nature of Scientific Knowledge: some reflections".

== Selected publications ==
According to Mathematical Reviews, Mukunda contributed to 143 scholarly publications, including

- 1974: (with George Sudarshan) Classical Dynamics: a modern perspective, John Wiley & Sons MR 0434047
- 1987: "The mathematical style of modern physics", pages 1 to 20 in Recent Developments in Theoretical Physics, World Scientific MR 0935612
- 1989: (with Rajiah Simon and Sudarshan) "Hamilton's theory of turns generalized to Sp(2,R)", Physical Review Letters 62(12): 1331–4 MR 0986460
- 1989: (with R. Simon and George Sudarshan) "The theory of screws: a new geometric representation for the group SU(1,1"), Journal of Mathematical Physics 30(5): 1000–1006 doi:10.1063/1.528365 MR 0992568
- 1989: (with R. Simon and George Sudarshan) "Hamilton's turns and a new geometrical representation for polarization optics", Pramana 32(6): 769–92.
- 1989: (with R. Jagannathan, Rajiah Simon & E.C.G. Sudarshan) "Quantum theory of magnetic electron lenses based on the Dirac equation", Physics Letters A 134(8/9): 457 doi:10.1016/0375-9601(89)90685-3 bibcode = 1989PhLA..134..457J pdf
- 1992: (with R. Simon) "Hamilton's turns and geometric phase for two-level systems", Journal of Physics A 25(22): 6135–44 MR 1193846
- 1993: Twisted Gaussian Schell-model beams. I & II. Symmetry structure and normal-mode spectrum via Indian Academy of Sciences
- 1996: "Planetary Motions and the Birth of Classical Mechanics", Current Science 71(7): 527–32 MR 1412435
- 1997: "Geometry, Fields, and Cosmology", Fundamental Theories of Physics 88, Kluwer MR 1601142 (from First Inter-University Graduate School on Gravitation and Cosmology held in Pune, 1989)
- 1999: "Mathematics and the Physicist's Conception of Nature", Current Science 76(5): 634–9 MR 1678395
- 2006: (with R. Simon, S. Chaturvedi, and V. Srinivasan) "Hamiltion's Turns for the Lorentz Group", International Journal of Theoretical Physics 45(11): 2051–2070 MR 2275839
- 2010: (with Sunil Mukhi) Lectures on Advanced Mathematical Methods for Physicists, World Scientific, ISBN 981-4299-73-1 MR 2777931 (Mukunda wrote part 2: Group Theory and Structure and Representations of Compact, Simple Lie Groups and Algebras.)
- 2017: (with Arvind and Chaturvedi) "Global aspects of polarization optics and coset space geometry", Physics Letters A 381(35): 3005–9 doi:10.1016/j.physleta.2017.06.053 MR 3688582
