= Fock state =

Number-state in quantum mechanics

In quantum mechanics, a Fock state or number state is a quantum state that is an element of a Fock space with a well-defined number of particles (or quanta). These states are named after the Soviet physicist Vladimir Fock. Fock states play an important role in the second quantization formulation of quantum mechanics.

The particle representation was first treated in detail by Paul Dirac for bosons and by Pascual Jordan and Eugene Wigner for fermions. The Fock states of bosons and fermions obey useful relations with respect to the Fock space creation and annihilation operators.

== Definition ==
One specifies a multiparticle state of N non-interacting identical particles by writing the state as a sum of tensor products of N one-particle states. Additionally, depending on the integrality of the particles' spin, the tensor products must be alternating (anti-symmetric) or symmetric products of the underlying one-particle Hilbert spaces. Specifically:

- Fermions, having half-integer spin and obeying the Pauli exclusion principle, correspond to antisymmetric tensor products.
- Bosons, possessing integer spin (and not governed by the exclusion principle) correspond to symmetric tensor products.

If the number of particles is variable, one constructs the Fock space as the direct sum of the tensor product Hilbert spaces for each particle number. In the Fock space, it is possible to specify the same state in a new notation, the occupancy number notation, by specifying the number of particles in each possible one-particle state.

Let $\left\{\mathbf{k}_{i}\right\}_{i \in I}$ be an orthonormal basis of states in the underlying one-particle Hilbert space. This induces a corresponding basis of the Fock space called the "occupancy number basis". A quantum state in the Fock space is called a Fock state if it is an element of the occupancy number basis.

A Fock state satisfies an important criterion: for each i, the state is an eigenstate of the particle number operator $\widehat{N_{{\mathbf{k}}_i}}$ corresponding to the i-th elementary state k_{i}. The corresponding eigenvalue gives the number of particles in the state. This criterion nearly defines the Fock states (one must in addition select a phase factor).

A given Fock state is denoted by $|n_{{\mathbf{k}}_1},n_{{\mathbf{k}}_2},..n_{{\mathbf{k}}_i}...\rangle$. In this expression, $n_{{\mathbf{k}}_i}$ denotes the number of particles in the i-th state k_{i}, and the particle number operator for the i-th state, $\widehat{N_{{\mathbf{k}}_i}}$, acts on the Fock state in the following way:

$$\widehat{N_{{\mathbf{k}}_i}}|n_{{\mathbf{k}}_1},n_{{\mathbf{k}}_2},..n_{{\mathbf{k}}_i}...\rangle = n_{{\mathbf{k}}_i}|n_{{\mathbf{k}}_1},n_{{\mathbf{k}}_2},..n_{{\mathbf{k}}_i}...\rangle$$

Hence the Fock state is an eigenstate of the number operator with eigenvalue $n_{{\mathbf{k}}_i}$.

Fock states often form the most convenient basis of a Fock space. Elements of a Fock space that are superpositions of states of differing particle number (and thus not eigenstates of the number operator) are not Fock states. For this reason, not all elements of a Fock space are referred to as "Fock states".

If we define the aggregate particle number operator $\widehat{N}$ as

$$\widehat{N} = \sum_i \widehat{N_{{\mathbf{k}}_i}},$$

the definition of Fock state ensures that the variance of measurement $\operatorname{Var}\left(\widehat{N}\right) = 0$, i.e., measuring the number of particles in a Fock state always returns a definite value with no fluctuation.

== Example using two particles ==
For any final state $|f\rangle$, any Fock state of two identical particles given by $|1_{{\mathbf{{k}}_1}}, 1_{{\mathbf{{k}}_2}}\rangle$, and any operator $\widehat{\mathbb{O}}$, we have the following condition for indistinguishability:

$$\left|\left\langle f\left|\widehat{\mathbb{O}}\right|1_{\mathbf{k}_1}, 1_{\mathbf{k}_2}\right\rangle\right|^2 =
\left|\left\langle f\left|\widehat{\mathbb{O}}\right|1_{\mathbf{k}_2}, 1_{\mathbf{k}_1}\right\rangle\right|^2$$.

So, we must have $\left\langle f\left|\widehat{\mathbb{O}}\right|1_{{\mathbf{{k}}_1}}, 1_{{\mathbf{{k}}_2}}\right\rangle = e^{i\delta}\left\langle f\left|\widehat{\mathbb{O}}\right|1_{{\mathbf{{k}}_2}}, 1_{{\mathbf{{k}}_1}}\right\rangle$

where $e^{i\delta} = +1$ for bosons and $-1$ for fermions. Since $\langle f|$ and $\widehat{\mathbb{O}}$ are arbitrary, we can say,

$\left|1_{\mathbf{k}_1}, 1_{\mathbf{k}_2}\right\rangle = +\left|1_{\mathbf{k}_2}, 1_{\mathbf{k}_1}\right\rangle$ for bosons and
$\left|1_{\mathbf{k}_1}, 1_{\mathbf{k}_2}\right\rangle = -\left|1_{\mathbf{k}_2}, 1_{\mathbf{k}_1}\right\rangle$ for fermions.

Note that the number operator does not distinguish bosons from fermions; indeed, it just counts particles without regard to their symmetry type. To perceive any difference between them, we need other operators, namely the creation and annihilation operators.

== Bosonic Fock state ==
Bosons, which are particles with integer spin, follow a simple rule: their composite eigenstate is symmetric under operation by an exchange operator. For example, in a two particle system in the tensor product representation we have $\hat{P}\left|x_1, x_2\right\rangle = \left|x_2, x_1\right\rangle$ .

=== Boson creation and annihilation operators ===
We should be able to express the same symmetric property in this new Fock space representation. For this we introduce non-Hermitian bosonic creation and annihilation operators, denoted by $b^{\dagger}$ and $b$ respectively. The action of these operators on a Fock state are given by the following two equations:

- Creation operator $b^{\dagger}_{{\mathbf{k}}_l}$:
  $b^{\dagger}_{{\mathbf{k}}_l}|n_{{\mathbf{k}}_{1}}, n_{{\mathbf{k}}_{2}},n_{{\mathbf{k}}_{3}}...n_{{\mathbf{k}}_{l}},...\rangle=\sqrt{n_{{\mathbf{k}}_{l}} +1 } |n_{{\mathbf{k}}_{1}}, n_{{\mathbf{k}}_{2}} ,n_{{\mathbf{k}}_{3}}...n_{{\mathbf{k}}_{l}}+1 ,...\rangle$
- Annihilation operator $b_{{\mathbf{k}}_l}$:
  $b_{{\mathbf{k}}_l}|n_{{\mathbf{k}}_{1}}, n_{{\mathbf{k}}_{2}},n_{{\mathbf{k}}_{3}}...n_{{\mathbf{k}}_{l}},...\rangle=\sqrt{n_{{\mathbf{k}}_{l}}} |n_{{\mathbf{k}}_{1}}, n_{{\mathbf{k}}_{2}}, n_{{\mathbf{k}}_{3}}...n_{{\mathbf{k}}_{l}}-1 ,...\rangle$

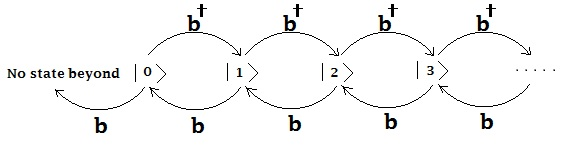
The Operation of creation and annihilation operators on Bosonic Fock states.

==== Non-Hermiticity of creation and annihilation operators ====
The bosonic Fock state creation and annihilation operators are not Hermitian operators.

Proof that creation and annihilation operators are not Hermitian.

For a Fock state, $|n_{\mathbf{k}_1}, n_{\mathbf{k}_2}, n_{\mathbf{k}_3} \dots n_{\mathbf{k}_l}, \dots \rangle$,
$$\begin{align}
\left\langle n_{\mathbf{k}_1}, n_{\mathbf{k}_2}, n_{\mathbf{k}_3} \dots n_{\mathbf{k}_l} - 1, \dots
\left| b_{\mathbf{k}_l} \right|
n_{\mathbf{k}_1}, n_{\mathbf{k}_2}, n_{\mathbf{k}_3} \dots n_{\mathbf{k}_l}, \dots \right\rangle
&= \sqrt{n_{\mathbf{k}_l}}\left\langle n_{\mathbf{k}_1}, n_{\mathbf{k}_2}, n_{\mathbf{k}_3} \dots n_{\mathbf{k}_l} - 1, \dots
| n_{\mathbf{k}_1}, n_{\mathbf{k}_2}, n_{\mathbf{k}_3} \dots n_{\mathbf{k}_l} - 1, \dots \right\rangle \\[6pt]
\left(\left\langle n_{\mathbf{k}_1}, n_{\mathbf{k}_2}, n_{\mathbf{k}_3} \dots n_{\mathbf{k}_l}, \dots
\left| b_{\mathbf{k}_l} \right|
n_{\mathbf{k}_1}, n_{\mathbf{k}_2}, n_{\mathbf{k}_3} \dots n_{\mathbf{k}_l} - 1, \dots \right\rangle\right)^*
&= \left\langle n_{\mathbf{k}_1}, n_{\mathbf{k}_2}, n_{\mathbf{k}_3} \dots n_{\mathbf{k}_l} - 1 \dots
\left| b_{\mathbf{k}_l}^\dagger \right|
n_{\mathbf{k}_1}, n_{\mathbf{k}_2}, n_{\mathbf{k}_3} \dots n_{\mathbf{k}_l}, \dots \right\rangle \\
&= \sqrt{n_{\mathbf{k}_l} + 1}\left\langle n_{\mathbf{k}_1}, n_{\mathbf{k}_2}, n_{\mathbf{k}_3} \dots n_{\mathbf{k}_l} - 1 \dots
| n_{\mathbf{k}_1}, n_{\mathbf{k}_2}, n_{\mathbf{k}_3} \dots n_{\mathbf{k}_l} + 1 \dots \right\rangle
\end{align}$$

Therefore, it is clear that adjoint of creation (annihilation) operator doesn't go into itself. Hence, they are not Hermitian operators.

But adjoint of creation (annihilation) operator is annihilation (creation) operator.

==== Operator identities ====
The commutation relations of creation and annihilation operators in a bosonic system are

$\left[b^{\,}_i, b^\dagger_j\right] \equiv b^{\,}_i b^\dagger_j - b^\dagger_jb^{\,}_i = \delta_{i j},$
$\left[b^\dagger_i, b^\dagger_j\right] = \left[b^{\,}_i, b^{\,}_j\right] = 0,$

where $[\ \ , \ \ ]$ is the commutator and $\delta_{i j}$ is the Kronecker delta.

=== N bosonic basis states ===
Number of particles (N)	Bosonic basis states
0	$|0,0,0...\rangle$
1	$|1,0,0...\rangle$, $|0,1,0...\rangle$, $|0,0,1...\rangle$,...
2	$|2,0,0...\rangle$, $|1,1,0...\rangle$, $|0,2,0...\rangle$,...
$n$	$|n_{{\mathbf{k}}_{1}}, n_{{\mathbf{k}}_{2}} ,n_{{\mathbf{k}}_{3}}...n_{{\mathbf{k}}_{l}},...\rangle$

=== Action on some specific Fock states ===
- For a vacuum state—no particle is in any state— expressed as $|0_{{\mathbf{k}}_{1}}, 0_{{\mathbf{k}}_{2}}, 0_{{\mathbf{k}}_{3}}...0_{{\mathbf{k}}_{l}}, ...\rangle$, we have:
  $$b^{\dagger}_{{\mathbf{k}}_l}|0_{{\mathbf{k}}_{1}}, 0_{{\mathbf{k}}_{2}}, 0_{{\mathbf{k}}_{3}}...0_{{\mathbf{k}}_{l}}, ...\rangle = |0_{{\mathbf{k}}_{1}}, 0_{{\mathbf{k}}_{2}}, 0_{{\mathbf{k}}_{3}}...1_{{\mathbf{k}}_{l}}, ...\rangle$$
  and, $b_{\mathbf{k}_l}|0_{\mathbf{k}_1}, 0_{\mathbf{k}_2}, 0_{\mathbf{k}_3}...0_{\mathbf{k}_l}, ...\rangle = 0$. That is, the l-th creation operator creates a particle in the l-th state k_{l}, and the vacuum state is a fixed point of annihilation operators as there are no particles to annihilate.
- We can generate any Fock state by operating on the vacuum state with an appropriate number of creation operators:
  $$|n_{\mathbf{k}_1}, n_{\mathbf{k}_2} ...\rangle =
\frac{\left(b^\dagger_{\mathbf{k}_1}\right)^{n_{\mathbf{k}_1}}}{\sqrt{n_{\mathbf{k}_1}!}}
\frac{\left(b^\dagger_{\mathbf{k}_2}\right)^{n_{\mathbf{k}_2}}}{\sqrt{n_{\mathbf{k}_2}!}}...|0_{\mathbf{k}_{1}}, 0_{\mathbf{k}_{2}}, ...\rangle$$
- For a single mode Fock state, expressed as, $|n_\mathbf{k}\rangle$,
  $b^\dagger_\mathbf{k}|n_\mathbf{k}\rangle = \sqrt{n_\mathbf{k} + 1} |n_\mathbf{k} + 1\rangle$ and,
  $$b_\mathbf{k}|n_\mathbf{k}\rangle = \sqrt{n_\mathbf{k}} |n_\mathbf{k} - 1\rangle$$

=== Action of number operators ===
The number operators $\widehat{N_{{\mathbf{k}}_l}}$ for a bosonic system are given by $\widehat{N_{{\mathbf{k}}_l}}=b^{\dagger}_{{\mathbf{k}}_l}b_{{\mathbf{k}}_l}$, where $\widehat{N_{{\mathbf{k}}_l}}|n_{{\mathbf{k}}_{1}}, n_{{\mathbf{k}}_{2}} ,n_{{\mathbf{k}}_{3}}...n_{{\mathbf{k}}_{l}}...\rangle=n_{{\mathbf{k}}_{l}} |n_{{\mathbf{k}}_{1}}, n_{{\mathbf{k}}_{2}} ,n_{{\mathbf{k}}_{3}}...n_{{\mathbf{k}}_{l}}...\rangle$

Number operators are Hermitian operators.

=== Symmetric behaviour of bosonic Fock states ===
The commutation relations of the creation and annihilation operators ensure that the bosonic Fock states have the appropriate symmetric behaviour under particle exchange. Here, exchange of particles between two states (say, l and m) is done by annihilating a particle in state l and creating one in state m. If we start with a Fock state $|\psi\rangle = \left|n_{\mathbf{k}_1}, n_{\mathbf{k}_2} , .... n_{\mathbf{k}_m} ... n_{\mathbf{k}_l} ... \right\rangle$, and want to shift a particle from state $k_l$ to state $k_m$, then we operate the Fock state by $b_{\mathbf{k}_m}^\dagger b_{\mathbf{k}_l}$ in the following way:

Using the commutation relation we have, $b_{\mathbf{k}_m}^\dagger.b_{\mathbf{k}_l} = b_{\mathbf{k}_l}.b_{\mathbf{k}_m}^\dagger$

$$\begin{align}
b_{\mathbf{k}_m}^\dagger.b_{\mathbf{k}_l} \left|n_{\mathbf{k}_1}, n_{\mathbf{k}_2}, .... n_{\mathbf{k}_m} ... n_{\mathbf{k}_l} ... \right\rangle
&= b_{\mathbf{k}_l}.b_{\mathbf{k}_m}^\dagger \left|n_{\mathbf{k}_1}, n_{\mathbf{k}_2}, .... n_{\mathbf{k}_m} ... n_{\mathbf{k}_l} ... \right\rangle
\\
&= \sqrt{n_{\mathbf{k}_m} + 1}\sqrt{n_{\mathbf{k}_l}} \left|n_{\mathbf{k}_1}, n_{\mathbf{k}_2}, .... n_{\mathbf{k}_{m}} + 1 ... n_{\mathbf{k}_l} - 1 ...\right\rangle
\end{align}$$

So, the Bosonic Fock state behaves to be symmetric under operation by Exchange operator.

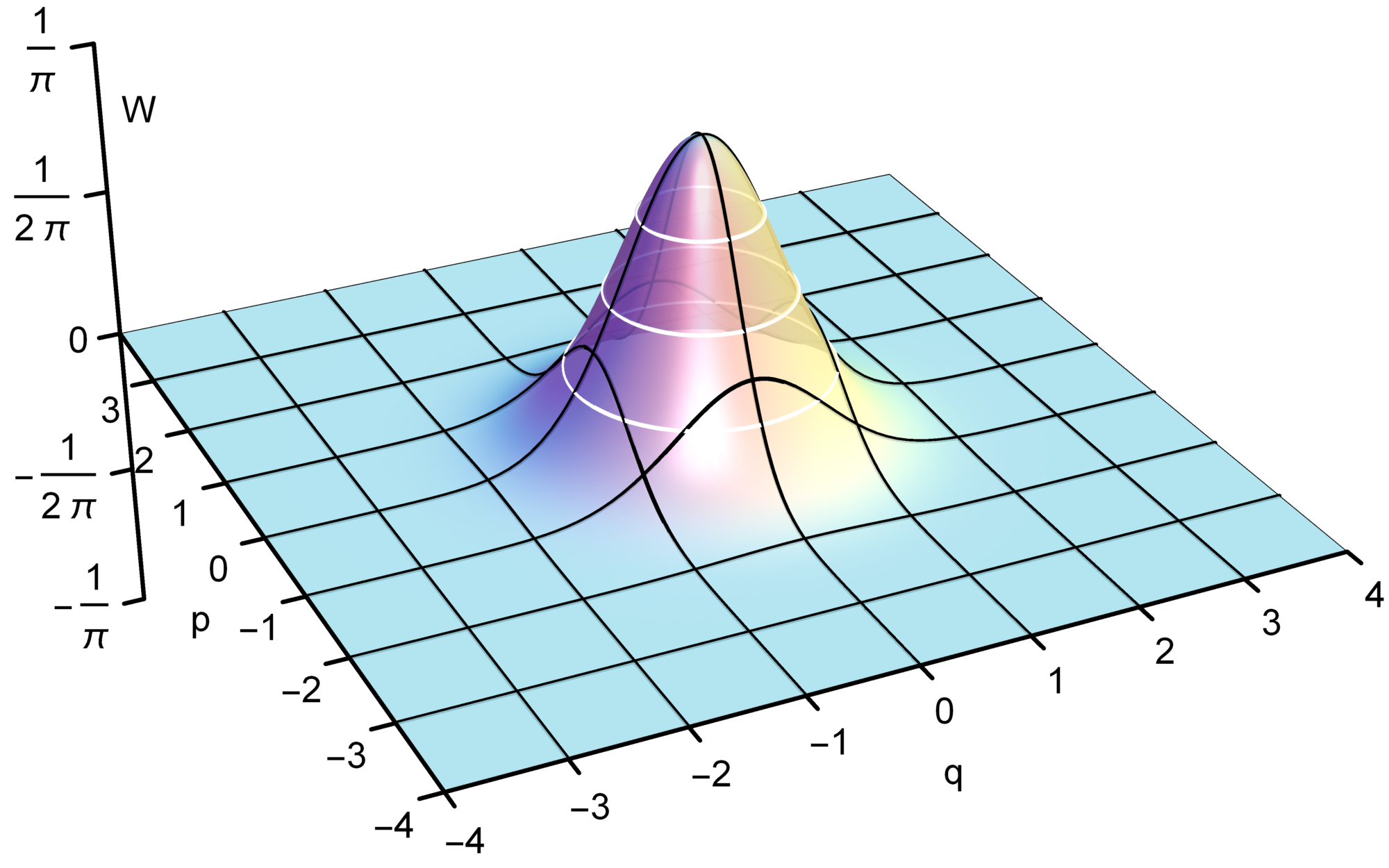
Wigner function of $|0\rangle$

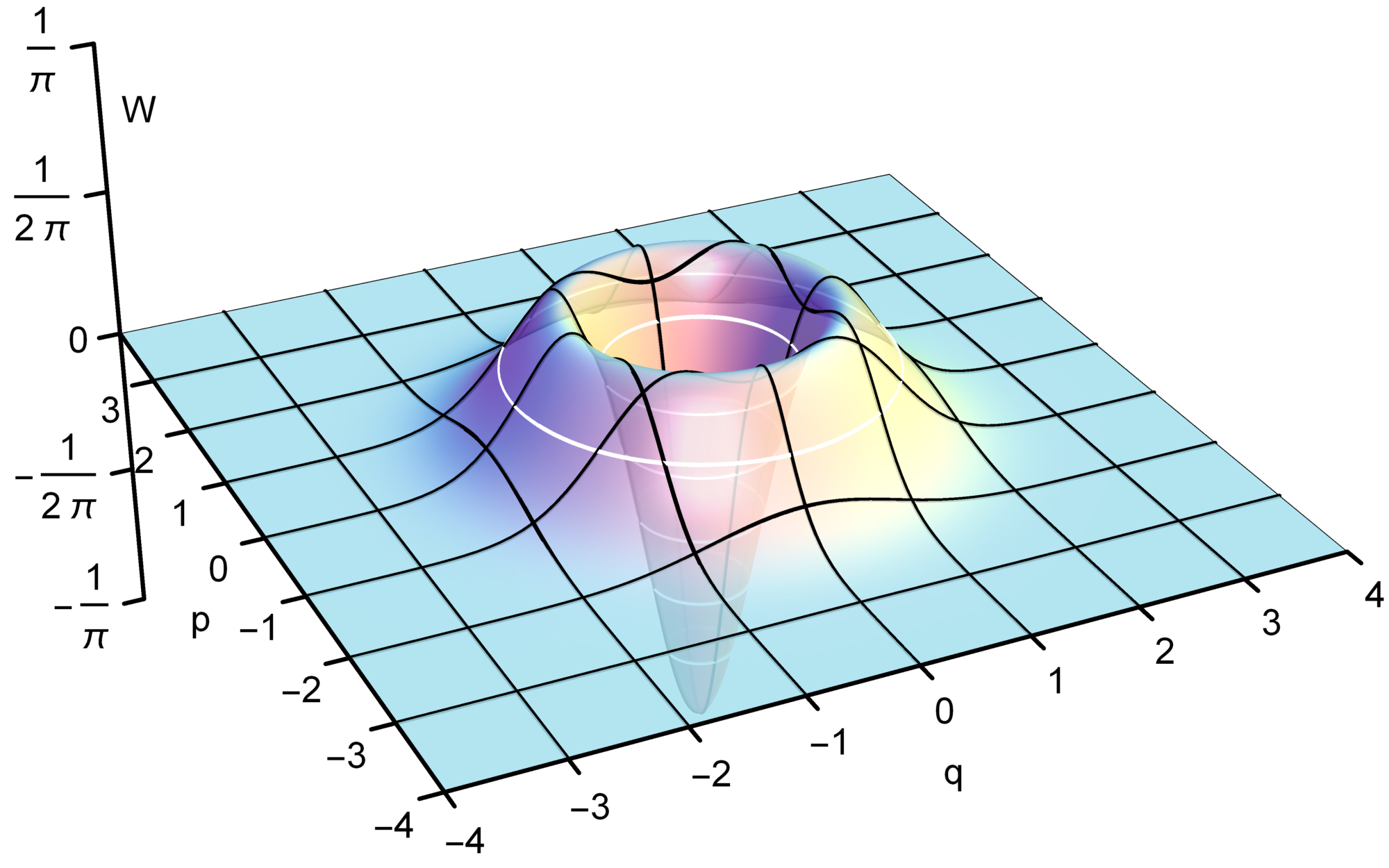
Wigner function of $|1\rangle$

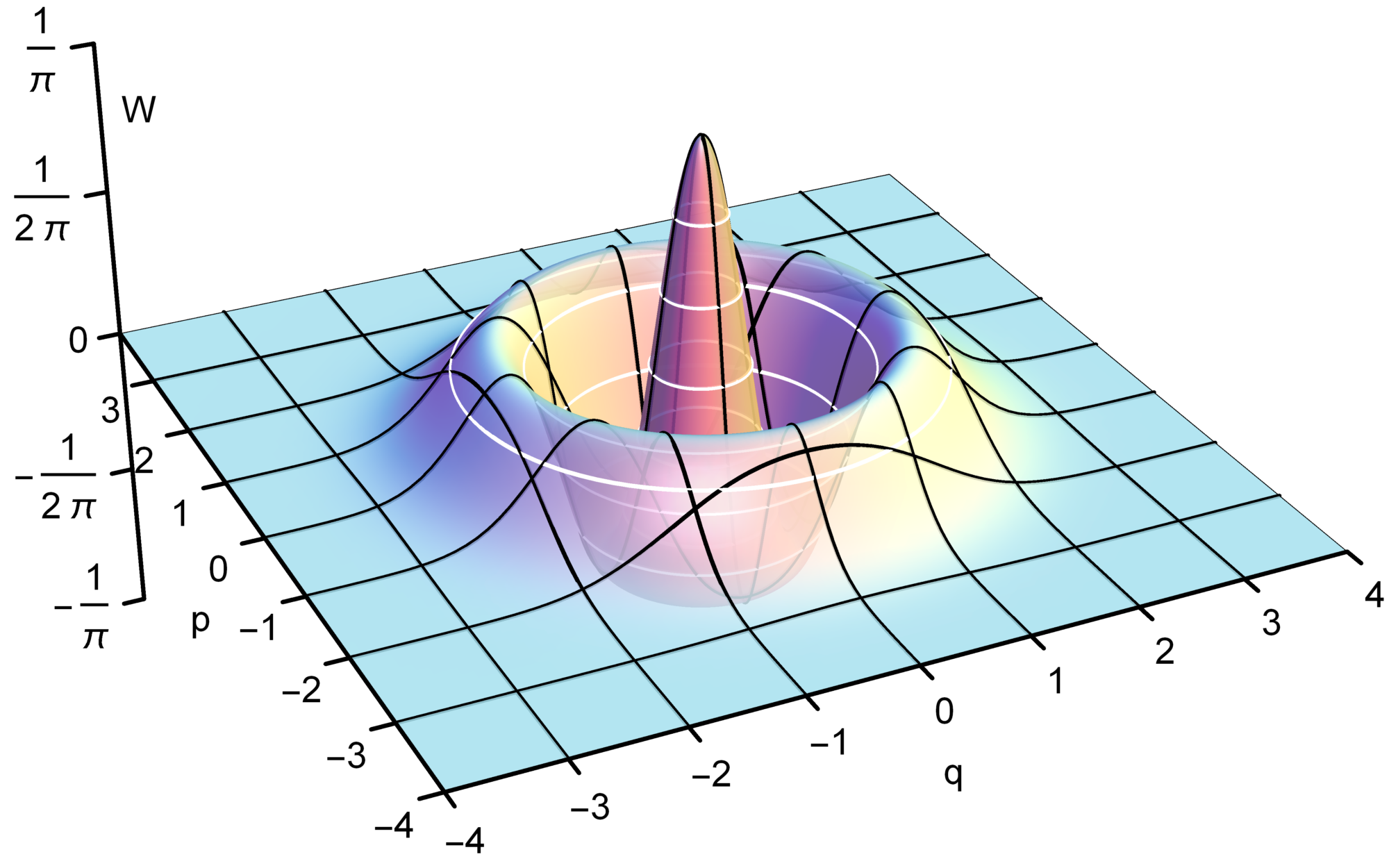
Wigner function of $|2\rangle$

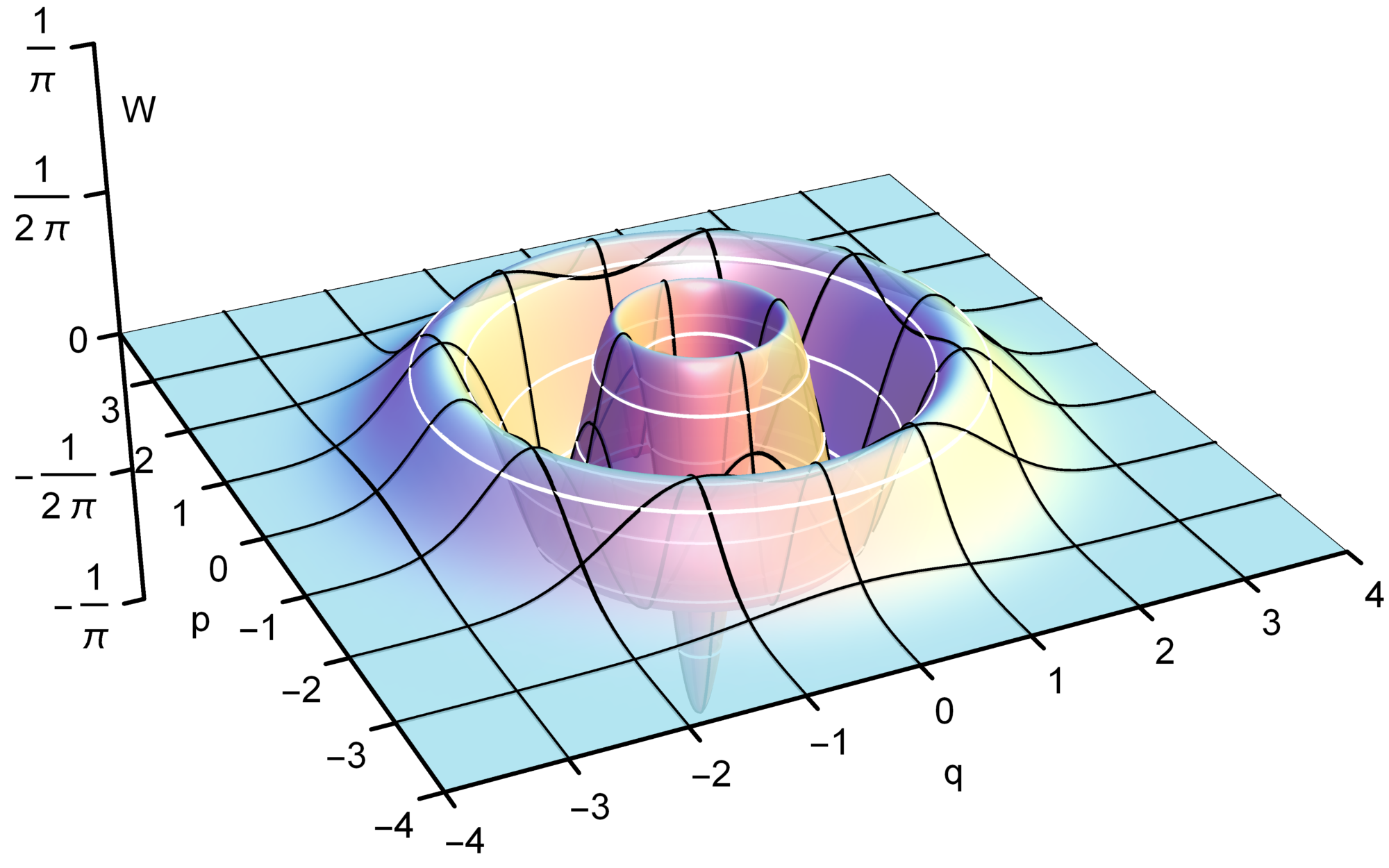
Wigner function of $|3\rangle$

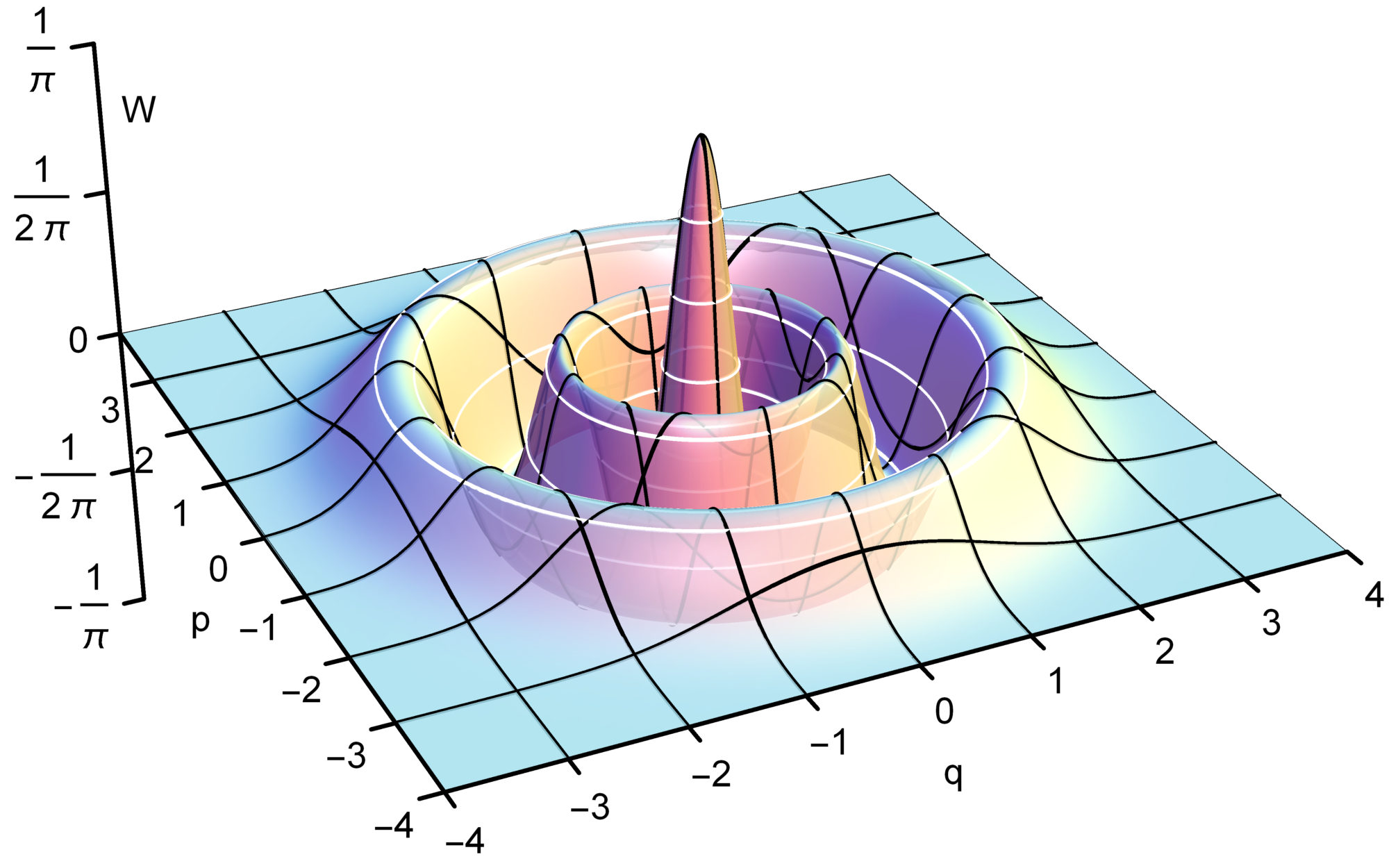
Wigner function of $|4\rangle$

== Fermionic Fock state ==
=== Occupation number representation ===
In the occupation number representation the single particle basis states are written with the occupation number of each orbital. For Fermion states, the occupation number can only be either zero or one and the order of the orbitals is significant.

Number of particles (N)	Fermionic basis states $\left|n_{\mathbf{k}_1}, n_{\mathbf{k}_2}, n_{\mathbf{k}_3} ... n_{\mathbf{k}_l}, ...\right\rangle$
0	$|0,0,0...\rangle$
1	$|1,0,0...\rangle$, $|0,1,0...\rangle$, $|0,0,1...\rangle$,...
2	$|1,1,0...\rangle$, $|0,1,1...\rangle$, $|0,1,0,1...\rangle$, $|1,0,1,0...\rangle$...
...	...

=== Fermion creation and annihilation operators ===
To retain the antisymmetric behaviour of fermions non-Hermitian fermion creation and annihilation operators are defined for a Fermionic Fock state $|\psi\rangle = |n_{{\mathbf{k}}_{1}}, n_{{\mathbf{k}}_{2}} ,n_{{\mathbf{k}}_{3}}...n_{{\mathbf{k}}_{l}},...\rangle$ as:

- The creation operator $c^{\dagger}_{{\mathbf{k}}_l}$ acts on the basis states as:
  $c^{\dagger}_{{\mathbf{k}}_l}|n_{{\mathbf{k}}_{1}}, n_{{\mathbf{k}}_{2}} ,n_{{\mathbf{k}}_{3}}...n_{{\mathbf{k}}_{l}},...\rangle=\sqrt{n_{{\mathbf{k}}_{l}} +1 } |n_{{\mathbf{k}}_{1}}, n_{{\mathbf{k}}_{2}} ,n_{{\mathbf{k}}_{3}}...n_{{\mathbf{k}}_{l}}+1 ,...\rangle$
- The annihilation operator $c_{{\mathbf{k}}_l}$ acts as:
  $$c_{{\mathbf{k}}_l}|n_{{\mathbf{k}}_{1}}, n_{{\mathbf{k}}_{2}} ,n_{{\mathbf{k}}_{3}}...n_{{\mathbf{k}}_{l}},...\rangle=\sqrt{n_{{\mathbf{k}}_{l}}} |n_{{\mathbf{k}}_{1}}, n_{{\mathbf{k}}_{2}} ,n_{{\mathbf{k}}_{3}}...n_{{\mathbf{k}}_{l}}-1 ,...\rangle$$

==== Operator identities ====
The anticommutation relations of creation and annihilation operators in a fermionic system are,

$$\begin{align}
\left\{c^{\,}_i, c^\dagger_j\right\} \equiv c^{\,}_i c^\dagger_j + c^\dagger_jc^{\,}_i &= \delta_{ij}, \\
\left\{c^\dagger_i, c^\dagger_j\right\} = \left\{c^{\,}_i, c^{\,}_j\right\} &= 0,
\end{align}$$

where ${\{ \ , \ \} }$ is the anticommutator and $\delta_{i j}$ is the Kronecker delta. These anticommutation relations can be used to show antisymmetric behaviour of Fermionic Fock states.

=== Action of number operators ===
Number operators $\widehat{N_{{\mathbf{k}}_l}}$ for Fermions are given by $\widehat{N_{{\mathbf{k}}_l}}=c^{\dagger}_{{\mathbf{k}}_l}.c_{{\mathbf{k}}_l}$.

$\widehat{N_{{\mathbf{k}}_l}}|n_{{\mathbf{k}}_{1}}, n_{{\mathbf{k}}_{2}} ,n_{{\mathbf{k}}_{3}}...n_{{\mathbf{k}}_{l}}...\rangle=n_{{\mathbf{k}}_{l}} |n_{{\mathbf{k}}_{1}}, n_{{\mathbf{k}}_{2}} ,n_{{\mathbf{k}}_{3}}...n_{{\mathbf{k}}_{l}}...\rangle$

==== Maximum occupation number ====
The action of the number operator as well as the creation and annihilation operators might seem same as the bosonic ones, but the real twist comes from the maximum occupation number of each state in the fermionic Fock state. Extending the 2-particle fermionic example above, we first must convince ourselves that a fermionic Fock state $|\psi\rangle = \left|n_{\mathbf{k}_1}, n_{\mathbf{k}_2}, n_{\mathbf{k}_3} ... n_{\mathbf{k}_l} ... \right\rangle$ is obtained by applying a certain sum of permutation operators to the tensor product of eigenkets as follows:

$$\left|n_{\mathbf{k}_1}, n_{\mathbf{k}_2}, n_{\mathbf{k}_3} ... n_{\mathbf{k}_l} ...\right\rangle =
S_-\left|i_1, i_2, i_3 ... i_l ...\right\rangle =
\frac{1}{\sqrt{N!}}\begin{vmatrix}
\left|i_1\right\rangle_1 & \cdots & \left|i_1\right\rangle_N \\
\vdots & \ddots &                   \vdots \\
\left|i_N\right\rangle_1 & \cdots & \left|i_N\right\rangle_N
\end{vmatrix}$$

This determinant is called the Slater determinant. If any of the single particle states are the same, two rows of the Slater determinant would be the same and hence the determinant would be zero. Hence, two identical fermions must not occupy the same state (a statement of the Pauli exclusion principle). Therefore, the occupation number of any single state is either 0 or 1. The eigenvalue associated to the fermionic Fock state $\widehat{N_{{\mathbf{k}}_l}}$ must be either 0 or 1.

=== Action on some specific Fock states ===
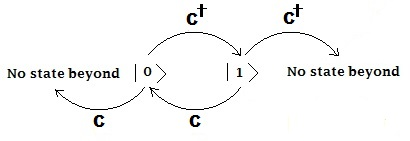
The operation of creation and annihilation operators on Fermionic Fock states.

- For a single mode fermionic Fock state, expressed as $\left|0_\mathbf{k}\right\rangle$,
  $$c^\dagger_\mathbf{k} \left|0_\mathbf{k}\right\rangle = \left|1_\mathbf{k}\right\rangle$$
  and $c^{\dagger}_\mathbf{k} \left|1_\mathbf{k}\right\rangle = 0$, as the maximum occupation number of any state is 1. No more than 1 fermion can occupy the same state, as stated in the Pauli exclusion principle.
- For a single mode fermionic Fock state, expressed as $\left|1_\mathbf{k}\right\rangle$,
  $$c_\mathbf{k} \left|1_\mathbf{k}\right\rangle = \left|0_\mathbf{k}\right\rangle$$
  and $c_\mathbf{k}\left|0_\mathbf{k}\right\rangle = 0$, as the particle number cannot be less than zero.
- For a multimode fermionic Fock state, expressed as, $\left|n_{\mathbf{k}_1}, n_{\mathbf{k}_2}, ... n_{\mathbf{k}_\beta}, n_{\mathbf{k}_\alpha}, ...\right\rangle$
  $$c_{\mathbf{k}_\alpha}\left|n_{\mathbf{k}_1}, n_{\mathbf{k}_2}, ... n_{\mathbf{k}_\beta}, n_{\mathbf{k}_\alpha}, ...\right\rangle =
(-1)^{\sum_{\beta < \alpha} n_\beta} \left|n_{\mathbf{k}_1}, n_{\mathbf{k}_2}, ... ,n_{\mathbf{k}_\beta},1 - n_{\mathbf{k}_\alpha}, ...\right\rangle$$,
  where $(-1)^{\sum_{\beta < \alpha} n_\beta}$ is called the Jordan–Wigner string, which depends on the ordering of the involved single-particle states and adding the fermion occupation numbers of all preceding states.

=== Antisymmetric behaviour of Fermionic Fock state ===
Antisymmetric behaviour of Fermionic states under Exchange operator is taken care of by the anticommutation relations. Here, exchange of particles between two states is done by annihilating one particle in one state and creating one in other. If we start with a Fock state $|\psi\rangle = \left|n_{\mathbf{k}_1}, n_{\mathbf{k}_2}, ... n_{\mathbf{k}_m}... n_{\mathbf{k}_l} ...\right\rangle$ and want to shift a particle from state $k_l$ to state $k_m$, then we operate the Fock state by $c_{\mathbf{k}_m}^{\dagger}.c_{\mathbf{k}_l}$ in the following way:

Using the anticommutation relation we have

$$c_{\mathbf{k}_m}^\dagger.c_{\mathbf{k}_l} = -c_{\mathbf{k}_l}.c_{\mathbf{k}_m}^\dagger$$
$$c_{\mathbf{k}_m}^{\dagger}.c_{\mathbf{k}_l} \left|n_{\mathbf{k}_1}, n_{\mathbf{k}_2}, .... n_{\mathbf{k}_m} ... n_{\mathbf{k}_l} ... \right\rangle =
\sqrt{n_{\mathbf{k}_m} + 1}\sqrt{n_{\mathbf{k}_l}} \left|n_{\mathbf{k}_1}, n_{\mathbf{k}_2}, .... n_{\mathbf{k}_m} + 1 ... n_{\mathbf{k}_l} - 1 ...\right\rangle$$

but,
$$\begin{align}
&c_{{\mathbf{k}}_{l}}.c_{{\mathbf{k}}_{m}}^{\dagger}|n_{{\mathbf{k}}_{1}}, n_{{\mathbf{k}}_{2}}, ....n_{{\mathbf{k}}_{m}}... n_{{\mathbf{k}}_{l}}...\rangle \\
={} -&c_{{\mathbf{k}}_{m}}^{\dagger}.c_{{\mathbf{k}}_{l}}|n_{{\mathbf{k}}_{1}}, n_{{\mathbf{k}}_{2}}, .... n_{{\mathbf{k}}_{m}}... n_{{\mathbf{k}}_{l}}...\rangle \\
={} -&\sqrt{n_{{\mathbf{k}}_{m}} +1 }\sqrt{n_{{\mathbf{k}}_{l}}}|n_{{\mathbf{k}}_{1}}, n_{{\mathbf{k}}_{2}}, .... n_{{\mathbf{k}}_{m}} + 1 ... n_{{\mathbf{k}}_{l}} - 1...\rangle
\end{align}$$

Thus, fermionic Fock states are antisymmetric under operation by particle exchange operators.

== Fock states are not energy eigenstates in general ==
In second quantization theory, the Hamiltonian density function is given by

$\mathfrak{H} = \frac{1}{2m} \nabla_{i}\psi^{*}(x)\, \nabla_{i}\psi(x)$

The total Hamiltonian is given by

$$\begin{align}
\mathcal{H} &= \int d^3 x\,\mathfrak{H}
= \int d^{3}x \psi^{*}(x)\left(-\frac{\nabla^2}{2m}\right)\psi(x) \\
\therefore \mathfrak{H} &= -\frac{\nabla^2}{2m}
\end{align}$$

In free Schrödinger theory,

$$\mathfrak{H}\psi_{n}^{(+)}(x) = -\frac{\nabla^2}{2m}\psi_{n}^{(+)}(x) = E_{n}^{0}\psi_{n}^{(+)}(x)$$

and

$$\int d^3 x\, \psi_{n}^{(+)^{*}}(x)\, \psi_{n'}^{(+)}(x) = \delta_{nn'}$$

and

$$\psi(x) = \sum_n a_n \psi_{n}^{(+)}(x)$$,

where $a_n$ is the annihilation operator.

$$\therefore \mathcal{H} = \sum_{n,n'}\int d^{3}x\, a^{\dagger}_{n'}\psi_{n'}^{(+)^{*}}(x)\, \mathfrak{H}a_n \psi_{n}^{(+)}(x)$$

Only for non-interacting particles do $\mathfrak{H}$ and $a_n$ commute; in general they do not commute. For non-interacting particles,

$$\mathcal{H} =
\sum_{n,n'}\int d^3 x\, a^{\dagger}_{n'}\psi_{n'}^{(+)^{*}}(x)\, E^{0}_{n}\psi_{n}^{(+)}(x)a_n =
\sum_{n,n'}E^{0}_{n} a^{\dagger}_{n'}a_n\delta_{nn'} =
\sum_{n}E^{0}_{n}a^{\dagger}_n a_n =
\sum_{n}E^{0}_{n}\widehat{N}$$

If they do not commute, the Hamiltonian will not have the above expression. Therefore, in general, Fock states are not energy eigenstates of a system.

== Vacuum fluctuations ==
The vacuum state or $|0\rangle$ is the state of the lowest energy and the expectation values of $a$ and $a^\dagger$ vanish in this state:

$$\langle 0 | a|0\rangle  = \langle 0 |a^\dagger|0\rangle = 0$$

The electric and magnetic fields and the vector potential have the mode expansion of the same general form:

$$F\left(\vec{r}, t\right) = \varepsilon a e^{i\vec{k}\cdot\vec{r} - \omega t} + \varepsilon a^\dagger e^{-i\vec{k}\cdot\vec{r} - \omega t}$$

The expectation values of these field operators vanish in the vacuum state:

$$\langle 0|F|0 \rangle = 0$$

However, the expectation values of the square of these field operators are non-zero: there are field fluctuations in the vacuum state. These vacuum fluctuations are responsible for many interesting phenomena including the Lamb shift in quantum optics.

== Multi-mode Fock states ==
In a multi-mode field each creation and annihilation operator operates on its own mode. So $a_{\mathbf{k}_l}$ and $a^{\dagger}_{\mathbf{k}_l}$ will operate only on $\left|n_{\mathbf{k}_l}\right\rangle$. Since operators corresponding to different modes operate in different sub-spaces of the Hilbert space, the entire field is a direct product of $|n_{\mathbf{k}_l}\rangle$ over all the modes:

$$\left|n_{\mathbf{k}_1}\right\rangle \left|n_{\mathbf{k}_2}\right\rangle \left|n_{\mathbf{k}_3}\right\rangle \ldots \equiv
\left|n_{\mathbf{k}_1}, n_{\mathbf{k}_2}, n_{\mathbf{k}_3}... n_{\mathbf{k}_l}... \right\rangle \equiv
\left|\{n_\mathbf{k}\}\right\rangle$$

The creation and annihilation operators operate on the multi-mode state by only raising or lowering the number state of their own mode:

$$\begin{align}
a_{{\mathbf{k}}_l} |n_{{\mathbf{k}}_{1}}, n_{{\mathbf{k}}_{2}}, n_{{\mathbf{k}}_{3}}... n_{{\mathbf{k}}_{l}}, ...\rangle &=
\sqrt{n_{{\mathbf{k}}_{l}}} |n_{{\mathbf{k}}_{1}}, n_{{\mathbf{k}}_{2}}, n_{{\mathbf{k}}_{3}}... n_{{\mathbf{k}}_{l}}-1, ...\rangle \\
a^{\dagger}_{{\mathbf{k}}_l} |n_{{\mathbf{k}}_{1}}, n_{{\mathbf{k}}_{2}}, n_{{\mathbf{k}}_{3}}... n_{{\mathbf{k}}_{l}},...\rangle &=
\sqrt{n_{{\mathbf{k}}_{l}} +1 } |n_{{\mathbf{k}}_{1}}, n_{{\mathbf{k}}_{2}}, n_{{\mathbf{k}}_{3}}... n_{{\mathbf{k}}_{l}} + 1, ...\rangle
\end{align}$$

We also define the total number operator for the field which is a sum of number operators of each mode:

$$\hat{n}_{\mathbf{k}} = \sum \hat{n}_{\mathbf{k}_l}$$

The multi-mode Fock state is an eigenvector of the total number operator whose eigenvalue is the total occupation number of all the modes

$$\hat{n}_{\mathbf{k}} |\{n_{\mathbf{k}}\}\rangle = \left( \sum n_{\mathbf{k}_l} \right) |\{n_{\mathbf{k}}\}\rangle$$

In case of non-interacting particles, number operator and Hamiltonian commute with each other and hence multi-mode Fock states become eigenstates of the multi-mode Hamiltonian

$$\hat{H} \left|\{n_{\mathbf{k}}\}\right\rangle = \left( \sum \hbar \omega \left(n_{\mathbf{k}_l}  + \frac{1}{2} \right)\right) \left|\{n_{\mathbf{k}}\}\right\rangle$$

== Source of single photon state ==
Single photons are routinely generated using single emitters (atoms, ions, molecules, Nitrogen-vacancy center, Quantum dot). However, these sources are not always very efficient, often presenting a low probability of actually getting a single photon on demand; and often complex and unsuitable out of a laboratory environment.

Other sources are commonly used that overcome these issues at the expense of a nondeterministic behavior. Heralded single photon sources are probabilistic two-photon sources from whom the pair is split and the detection of one photon heralds the presence of the remaining one. These sources usually rely on the optical non-linearity of some materials like periodically poled Lithium niobate (Spontaneous parametric down-conversion), or silicon (spontaneous Four-wave mixing) for example.

== Non-classical behaviour ==
The Glauber–Sudarshan P-representation of Fock states shows that these states are purely quantum mechanical and have no classical counterpart. The $\scriptstyle\varphi(\alpha) \,$ of these states in the representation is a $2n$'th derivative of the Dirac delta function and therefore not a classical probability distribution.

== See also ==
- Coherent states
- Heisenberg limit
- Nonclassical light
