= Normal order =

Type of operator ordering in quantum field theory

In quantum field theory a product of quantum fields, or equivalently their creation and annihilation operators, is usually said to be normal ordered (also called Wick order) when all creation operators are to the left of all annihilation operators in the product. The process of putting a product into normal order is called normal ordering (also called Wick ordering). The terms antinormal order and antinormal ordering are analogously defined, where the annihilation operators are placed to the left of the creation operators.

Normal ordering of a product of quantum fields or creation and annihilation operators can also be defined in many other ways. Which definition is most appropriate depends on the expectation values needed for a given calculation. Most of this article uses the most common definition of normal ordering as given above, which is appropriate when taking expectation values using the vacuum state of the creation and annihilation operators.

The process of normal ordering is particularly important for a quantum mechanical Hamiltonian. When quantizing a classical Hamiltonian there is some freedom when choosing the operator order, and these choices lead to differences in the ground state energy. That's why the process can also be used to eliminate the infinite vacuum energy of a quantum field.

== Notation ==
If $\hat{O}$ denotes an arbitrary product of creation and/or annihilation operators (or equivalently, quantum fields), then the normal ordered form of $\hat{O}$ is denoted by $\mathopen{:} \hat{O} \mathclose{:}$.

An alternative notation is $\mathcal{N}(\hat{O})$.

Note that normal ordering is a concept that only makes sense for products of operators. Attempting to apply normal ordering to a sum of operators is not useful as normal ordering is not a linear operation.

== Bosons ==
Bosons are particles which satisfy Bose–Einstein statistics. We will now examine the normal ordering of bosonic creation and annihilation operator products.

=== Single bosons ===
If we start with only one type of boson there are two operators of interest:

- $\hat{b}^\dagger$: the boson's creation operator.
- $\hat{b}$: the boson's annihilation operator.

These satisfy the commutator relationship

$$\left[\hat{b}^\dagger, \hat{b}^\dagger \right]_- = 0$$
$$\left[\hat{b}, \hat{b} \right]_- = 0$$
$$\left[\hat{b}, \hat{b}^\dagger \right]_- = 1$$

where $\left[ A, B \right]_- \equiv AB - BA$ denotes the commutator. We may rewrite the last one as: $\hat{b}\, \hat{b}^\dagger = \hat{b}^\dagger\, \hat{b} + 1.$

==== Examples ====
1. We'll consider the simplest case first. This is the normal ordering of $\hat{b}^\dagger \hat{b}$:

$${:\,}\hat{b}^\dagger \, \hat{b}{\,:} = \hat{b}^\dagger \, \hat{b}.$$

The expression $\hat{b}^\dagger \, \hat{b}$ has not been changed because it is already in normal order - the creation operator $(\hat{b}^\dagger)$ is already to the left of the annihilation operator $(\hat{b})$.

2. A more interesting example is the normal ordering of $\hat{b} \, \hat{b}^\dagger$:

$${:\,}\hat{b} \, \hat{b}^\dagger{\,:} = \hat{b}^\dagger \, \hat{b}.$$

Here the normal ordering operation has reordered the terms by placing $\hat{b}^\dagger$ to the left of $\hat{b}$.

These two results can be combined with the commutation relation obeyed by $\hat{b}$ and $\hat{b}^\dagger$ to get

$$\hat{b} \, \hat{b}^\dagger = \hat{b}^\dagger \, \hat{b} + 1 = {:\,}\hat{b} \, \hat{b}^\dagger{\,:} \; + 1.$$

or

$$\hat{b} \, \hat{b}^\dagger -  {:\,}\hat{b} \, \hat{b}^\dagger{\,:} = 1.$$

This equation is used in defining the contractions used in Wick's theorem.

3. An example with multiple operators is:

$${:\,}\hat{b}^\dagger \, \hat{b} \, \hat{b} \, \hat{b}^\dagger \, \hat{b} \, \hat{b}^\dagger \, \hat{b}{\,:} = \hat{b}^\dagger \, \hat{b}^\dagger \, \hat{b}^\dagger \, \hat{b} \, \hat{b} \, \hat{b} \, \hat{b} = (\hat{b}^\dagger)^3 \, \hat{b}^4.$$

4. A simple example shows that normal ordering cannot be extended by linearity from the monomials to all operators in a self-consistent way. Assume that we can apply the commutation relations to obtain:

$${:\,}\hat{b} \hat{b}^\dagger{\,:} = {:\,}1 + \hat{b}^\dagger \hat{b}{\,:}.$$

Then, by linearity,

$${:\,}1 + \hat{b}^\dagger \hat{b}{\,:} = {:\,}1{\,:} + {:\,}\hat{b}^\dagger \hat{b}{\,:} =
1 + \hat{b}^\dagger \hat{b} \ne \hat{b}^\dagger \hat{b}={:\,}\hat{b} \hat{b}^\dagger{\,:},$$

a contradiction.

The implication is that normal ordering is not a linear function on operators, but on the free algebra generated by the operators, i.e. the operators do not satisfy the canonical commutation relations while inside the normal ordering (or any other ordering operator like time-ordering, etc).

=== Multiple bosons ===
If we now consider $N$ different bosons there are $2 N$ operators:

- $\hat{b}_i^\dagger$: the $i^{th}$ boson's creation operator.
- $\hat{b}_i$: the $i^{th}$ boson's annihilation operator.

Here $i = 1,\ldots,N$.

These satisfy the commutation relations:

$$\left[\hat{b}_i^\dagger, \hat{b}_j^\dagger \right]_- = 0$$
$$\left[\hat{b}_i, \hat{b}_j \right]_- = 0$$
$$\left[\hat{b}_i, \hat{b}_j^\dagger \right]_- = \delta_{ij}$$

where $i,j = 1,\ldots,N$ and $\delta_{ij}$ denotes the Kronecker delta.

These may be rewritten as:

$$\hat{b}_i^\dagger \, \hat{b}_j^\dagger = \hat{b}_j^\dagger \, \hat{b}_i^\dagger$$
$$\hat{b}_i \, \hat{b}_j = \hat{b}_j \, \hat{b}_i$$
$$\hat{b}_i \,\hat{b}_j^\dagger = \hat{b}_j^\dagger \,\hat{b}_i + \delta_{ij}.$$

==== Examples ====
1. For two different bosons ($N=2$) we have

$$: \hat{b}_1^\dagger \,\hat{b}_2 : \,= \hat{b}_1^\dagger \,\hat{b}_2$$
$$: \hat{b}_2 \, \hat{b}_1^\dagger  : \,= \hat{b}_1^\dagger \,\hat{b}_2$$

2. For three different bosons ($N=3$) we have

$$: \hat{b}_1^\dagger \,\hat{b}_2 \,\hat{b}_3 : \,= \hat{b}_1^\dagger \,\hat{b}_2 \,\hat{b}_3$$

Notice that since (by the commutation relations) $\hat{b}_2 \,\hat{b}_3 = \hat{b}_3 \,\hat{b}_2$ the order in which we write the annihilation operators does not matter.

$$: \hat{b}_2 \, \hat{b}_1^\dagger \, \hat{b}_3  : \,= \hat{b}_1^\dagger \,\hat{b}_2 \, \hat{b}_3$$
$$: \hat{b}_3 \hat{b}_2 \, \hat{b}_1^\dagger  : \,= \hat{b}_1^\dagger \,\hat{b}_2 \, \hat{b}_3$$

=== Bosonic operator functions ===
Normal ordering of bosonic operator functions $f(\hat n)$, with occupation number operator $\hat n=\hat b\vphantom{\hat n}^\dagger \hat b$, can be accomplished using (falling) factorial powers $\hat n^{\underline{k}}=\hat n(\hat n-1)\cdots(\hat n-k+1)$ and Newton series instead of Taylor series: It is easy to show that factorial powers $\hat n^{\underline{k}}$ are equal to normal-ordered (raw) powers $\hat n^{k}$ and are therefore normal ordered by construction,

$$\hat{n}^{\underline{k}}
= \hat b\vphantom{\hat n}^{\dagger k} \hat b\vphantom{\hat n}^k
= {:\,}\hat n^k{\,:},$$

such that the Newton series expansion

$$\tilde f(\hat n) = \sum_{k=0}^\infty \Delta_n^k \tilde f(0) \, \frac{\hat n^{\underline{k}}}{k!}$$

of an operator function $\tilde f(\hat n)$, with $k$-th forward difference $\Delta_n^k \tilde f(0)$ at $n=0$, is always normal ordered. Here, the eigenvalue equation $\hat n |n\rangle = n |n\rangle$ relates $\hat n$ and $n$.

As a consequence, the normal-ordered Taylor series of an arbitrary function $f(\hat n)$ is equal to the Newton series of an associated function $\tilde f(\hat n)$, fulfilling

$$\tilde f(\hat n) = {:\,} f(\hat n) {\,:},$$

if the series coefficients of the Taylor series of $f(x)$, with continuous $x$, match the coefficients of the Newton series of $\tilde f(n)$, with integer $n$,

$$\begin{align}
f(x) &= \sum_{k=0}^\infty F_k \, \frac{x^k              }{k!}, \\
\tilde f(n) &= \sum_{k=0}^\infty F_k \, \frac{n^{\underline{k}}}{k!}, \\
F_k &= \partial_x^k f(0) = \Delta_n^k \tilde f(0),
\end{align}$$

with $k$-th partial derivative $\partial_x^k f(0)$ at $x=0$. The functions $f$ and $\tilde f$ are related through the so-called normal-order transform $\mathcal N[f]$ according to

$$\begin{align}
\tilde f(n) &= \mathcal N_x[f(x)](n) \\
&= \frac{1}{\Gamma(-n)} \int_{-\infty}^0 \mathrm d x \, e^x \, f(x) \, (-x)^{-(n+1)} \\
&= \frac{1}{\Gamma(-n)}\mathcal M_{-x}[e^{x} f(x)](-n),
\end{align}$$

which can be expressed in terms of the Mellin transform $\mathcal M$, see for details.

== Fermions ==
Fermions are particles which satisfy Fermi–Dirac statistics. We will now examine the normal ordering of fermionic creation and annihilation operator products.

=== Single fermions ===
For a single fermion there are two operators of interest:

- $\hat{f}^\dagger$: the fermion's creation operator.
- $\hat{f}$: the fermion's annihilation operator.

These satisfy the anticommutator relationships

$$\left[\hat{f}^\dagger, \hat{f}^\dagger \right]_+ = 0$$
$$\left[\hat{f}, \hat{f} \right]_+ = 0$$
$$\left[\hat{f}, \hat{f}^\dagger \right]_+ = 1$$

where $\left[A, B \right]_+ \equiv AB + BA$ denotes the anticommutator. These may be rewritten as

$$\hat{f}^\dagger\, \hat{f}^\dagger =  0$$
$$\hat{f} \,\hat{f}  =  0$$
$$\hat{f} \,\hat{f}^\dagger =  1 - \hat{f}^\dagger \,\hat{f} .$$

To define the normal ordering of a product of fermionic creation and annihilation operators we must take into account the number of interchanges between neighbouring operators. We get a minus sign for each such interchange.

==== Examples ====
1. We again start with the simplest cases:

$$: \hat{f}^\dagger \, \hat{f} : \,= \hat{f}^\dagger \, \hat{f}$$

This expression is already in normal order so nothing is changed. In the reverse case, we introduce a minus sign because we have to change the order of two operators:

$$: \hat{f} \, \hat{f}^\dagger : \,= -\hat{f}^\dagger \, \hat{f}$$

These can be combined, along with the anticommutation relations, to show

$$\hat{f} \, \hat{f}^\dagger \,= 1 - \hat{f}^\dagger \, \hat{f} = 1 + :\hat{f} \,\hat{f}^\dagger :$$

or

$$\hat{f} \, \hat{f}^\dagger -  : \hat{f} \, \hat{f}^\dagger : = 1.$$

This equation, which is in the same form as the bosonic case above, is used in defining the contractions used in Wick's theorem.

2. The normal order of any more complicated cases gives zero because there will be at least one creation or annihilation operator appearing twice. For example:

$$: \hat{f}\,\hat{f}^\dagger \, \hat{f} \hat{f}^\dagger  : \,= -\hat{f}^\dagger \,\hat{f}^\dagger \,\hat{f}\,\hat{f} = 0$$

=== Multiple fermions ===
For $N$ different fermions there are $2 N$ operators:

- $\hat{f}_i^\dagger$: the $i^{th}$ fermion's creation operator.
- $\hat{f}_i$: the $i^{th}$ fermion's annihilation operator.

Here $i = 1,\ldots,N$.

These satisfy the anti-commutation relations:

$$\left[\hat{f}_i^\dagger, \hat{f}_j^\dagger \right]_+ = 0$$
$$\left[\hat{f}_i, \hat{f}_j \right]_+ = 0$$
$$\left[\hat{f}_i, \hat{f}_j^\dagger \right]_+ = \delta_{ij}$$

where $i,j = 1,\ldots,N$ and $\delta_{ij}$ denotes the Kronecker delta.

These may be rewritten as:

$$\hat{f}_i^\dagger \, \hat{f}_j^\dagger = -\hat{f}_j^\dagger \, \hat{f}_i^\dagger$$
$$\hat{f}_i \, \hat{f}_j = -\hat{f}_j \, \hat{f}_i$$
$$\hat{f}_i \,\hat{f}_j^\dagger = \delta_{ij} - \hat{f}_j^\dagger \,\hat{f}_i .$$

When calculating the normal order of products of fermion operators we must take into account the number of interchanges of neighbouring operators required to rearrange the expression. It is as if we pretend the creation and annihilation operators anticommute and then we reorder the expression to ensure the creation operators are on the left and the annihilation operators are on the right - all the time taking account of the anticommutation relations.

==== Examples ====
1. For two different fermions ($N=2$) we have

$$: \hat{f}_1^\dagger \,\hat{f}_2 : \,= \hat{f}_1^\dagger \,\hat{f}_2$$

Here the expression is already normal ordered so nothing changes.

$$: \hat{f}_2 \, \hat{f}_1^\dagger  : \,= -\hat{f}_1^\dagger \,\hat{f}_2$$

Here we introduce a minus sign because we have interchanged the order of two operators.

$$: \hat{f}_2 \, \hat{f}_1^\dagger \, \hat{f}^\dagger_2  : \,= \hat{f}_1^\dagger \, \hat{f}_2^\dagger \,\hat{f}_2 = -\hat{f}_2^\dagger \, \hat{f}_1^\dagger \,\hat{f}_2$$

Note that the order in which we write the operators here, unlike in the bosonic case, does matter.

2. For three different fermions ($N=3$) we have

$$: \hat{f}_1^\dagger \, \hat{f}_2 \, \hat{f}_3 : \,= \hat{f}_1^\dagger \,\hat{f}_2 \,\hat{f}_3 = -\hat{f}_1^\dagger \,\hat{f}_3 \,\hat{f}_2$$

Notice that since (by the anticommutation relations) $\hat{f}_2 \,\hat{f}_3 = -\hat{f}_3 \,\hat{f}_2$ the order in which we write the operators does matter in this case.

Similarly we have

$$: \hat{f}_2 \, \hat{f}_1^\dagger \, \hat{f}_3  : \,= -\hat{f}_1^\dagger \,\hat{f}_2 \, \hat{f}_3 = \hat{f}_1^\dagger \,\hat{f}_3 \, \hat{f}_2$$
$$: \hat{f}_3 \hat{f}_2 \, \hat{f}_1^\dagger  : \,= \hat{f}_1^\dagger \,\hat{f}_3 \, \hat{f}_2 = -\hat{f}_1^\dagger \,\hat{f}_2 \, \hat{f}_3$$

== Uses in quantum field theory ==
The vacuum expectation value of a normal ordered product of creation and annihilation operators is zero. This is because, denoting the vacuum state by $|0\rangle$, the creation and annihilation operators satisfy

$$\langle 0 | \hat{a}^\dagger = 0 \qquad \textrm{and} \qquad \hat{a} |0\rangle = 0$$

(here $\hat{a}^\dagger$ and $\hat{a}$ are creation and annihilation operators (either bosonic or fermionic)).

Let $\hat{O}$ denote a non-empty product of creation and annihilation operators. Although this may satisfy

$$\langle 0 | \hat{O} | 0 \rangle \neq 0,$$

we have

$$\langle 0 | :\hat{O}: | 0 \rangle = 0.$$

Normal ordered operators are particularly useful when defining a quantum mechanical Hamiltonian. If the Hamiltonian of a theory is in normal order then the ground state energy will be zero: $\langle 0 |\hat{H}|0\rangle = 0$.

=== Free fields ===
With two free fields φ and χ,

$$:\phi(x)\chi(y):\,\,=\phi(x)\chi(y)-\langle 0|\phi(x)\chi(y)| 0\rangle$$

where $|0\rangle$ is again the vacuum state. Each of the two terms on the right hand side typically blows up in the limit as y approaches x but the difference between them has a well-defined limit. This allows us to define :φ(x)χ(x):.

=== Wick's theorem ===
Wick's theorem states the relationship between the time ordered product of $n$ fields and a sum of normal ordered products. This may be expressed for $n$ even as

$$\begin{align}
T\left[\phi(x_1)\cdots \phi(x_n)\right]=&:\phi(x_1)\cdots \phi(x_n):
+\sum_\textrm{perm}\langle 0 |T\left[\phi(x_1)\phi(x_2)\right]|0\rangle :\phi(x_3)\cdots \phi(x_n):\\
&+\sum_\textrm{perm}\langle 0 |T\left[\phi(x_1)\phi(x_2)\right]|0\rangle \langle 0 |T\left[\phi(x_3)\phi(x_4)\right]|0\rangle:\phi(x_5)\cdots \phi(x_n):\\
\vdots \\
&+\sum_\textrm{perm}\langle 0 |T\left[\phi(x_1)\phi(x_2)\right]|0\rangle\cdots \langle 0 |T\left[\phi(x_{n-1})\phi(x_n)\right]|0\rangle
\end{align}$$

where the summation is over all the distinct ways in which one may pair up fields. The result for $n$ odd looks the same except for the last line which reads

$$\sum_\text{perm}\langle 0 |T\left[\phi(x_1)\phi(x_2)\right]|0\rangle\cdots\langle 0 | T\left[\phi(x_{n-2})\phi(x_{n-1})\right]|0\rangle\phi(x_n).$$

This theorem provides a simple method for computing vacuum expectation values of time ordered products of operators and was the motivation behind the introduction of normal ordering.

== Alternative definitions ==
The most general definition of normal ordering involves splitting all quantum fields into two parts (for example see Evans and Steer 1996) $\phi_i(x)=\phi^+_i(x)+\phi^-_i(x)$. In a product of fields, the fields are split into the two parts and the $\phi^+(x)$ parts are moved so as to be always to the left of all the $\phi^-(x)$ parts. In the usual case considered in the rest frame of the particle, the $\phi^+(x)$ contains only creation operators, while the $\phi^-(x)$ contains only annihilation operators. As this is a mathematical identity, one can split fields in any way one likes. However, for this to be a useful procedure one demands that the normal ordered product of any combination of fields has zero expectation value

$$\langle :\phi_1(x_1)\phi_2(x_2)\ldots\phi_n(x_n):\rangle=0$$

It is also important for practical calculations that all the commutators (anti-commutator for fermionic fields) of all $\phi^+_i$ and $\phi^-_j$ are all c-numbers. These two properties means that we can apply Wick's theorem in the usual way, turning expectation values of time-ordered products of fields into products of c-number pairs, the contractions. In this generalised setting, the contraction is defined to be the difference between the time-ordered product and the normal ordered product of a pair of fields.

The simplest example is found in the context of thermal quantum field theory (Evans and Steer 1996). In this case the expectation values of interest are statistical ensembles, traces over all states weighted by $\exp (-\beta \hat{H})$. For instance, for a single bosonic quantum harmonic oscillator we have that the thermal expectation value of the number operator is simply the Bose–Einstein distribution

$$\langle\hat{b}^\dagger \hat{b}\rangle
= \frac{\mathrm{Tr} (e^{-\beta \omega \hat{b}^\dagger \hat{b}} \hat{b}^\dagger \hat{b} )}{\mathrm{Tr} (e^{-\beta \omega \hat{b}^\dagger \hat{b} })}
= \frac{1}{e^{\beta \omega}-1}$$

So here the number operator $\hat{b}^\dagger \hat{b}$ is normal ordered in the usual sense used in the rest of the article yet its thermal expectation values are non-zero. Applying Wick's theorem and doing calculation with the usual normal ordering in this thermal context is possible but computationally impractical. The solution is to define a different ordering, such that the $\phi^+_i$ and $\phi^-_j$ are linear combinations of the original annihilation and creations operators. The combinations are chosen to ensure that the thermal expectation values of normal ordered products are always zero so the split chosen will depend on the temperature.
