= Rabi problem =

Problem in quantum optics

The Rabi problem concerns the response of an atom to an applied harmonic electric field, with an applied frequency very close to the atom's natural frequency. It provides a simple and generally solvable example of light–atom interactions and is named after Isidor Isaac Rabi. The quantum Rabi problem describes the dynamics of a two-level quantum system interacting with a periodically varying external field.

== Classical Rabi problem ==
In the classical approach, the Rabi problem can be represented by the solution to the driven damped harmonic oscillator with the electric part of the Lorentz force as the driving term:

$$\ddot{x}_a + \frac{2}{\tau_0} \dot{x}_a + \omega_a^2 x_a = \frac{e}{m} E(t, \mathbf{r}_a),$$

where it has been assumed that the atom can be treated as a charged particle (of charge e) oscillating about its equilibrium position around a neutral atom. Here x_{a} is its instantaneous magnitude of oscillation, $\omega_a$ its natural oscillation frequency, and $\tau_0$ its natural lifetime:

$$\frac{2}{\tau_0} = \frac{2 e^2 \omega_a^2}{3 m c^3},$$

which has been calculated based on the dipole oscillator's energy loss from electromagnetic radiation.

To apply this to the Rabi problem, one assumes that the electric field E is oscillatory in time and constant in space:

$$E = E_0[e^{i\omega t} + e^{-i\omega t}] = 2 E_0 \cos \omega t,$$

and x_{a} is decomposed into a part u_{a} that is in-phase with the driving E field (corresponding to dispersion) and a part v_{a} that is out of phase (corresponding to absorption):

$$x_a = x_0 (u_a \cos \omega t + v_a \sin \omega t).$$

Here x_{0} is assumed to be constant, but u_{a} and v_{a} are allowed to vary in time. However, if the system is very close to resonance ($\omega \approx \omega_a$), then these values will be slowly varying in time, and we can make the assumption that $\dot{u}_a \ll \omega u_a$, $\dot{v}_a \ll \omega v_a$ and $\ddot{u}_a \ll \omega^2 u_a$, $\ddot{v}_a \ll \omega^2 v_a$.

With these assumptions, the Lorentz force equations for the in-phase and out-of-phase parts can be rewritten as

$$\dot{u} = -\delta v - \frac{u}{T},$$
$$\dot{v} = \delta u - \frac{v}{T} + \kappa E_0,$$

where we have replaced the natural lifetime $\tau_0$ with a more general effective lifetime T (which could include other interactions such as collisions) and have dropped the subscript a in favor of the newly defined detuning $\delta = \omega - \omega_a$, which serves equally well to distinguish atoms of different resonant frequencies. Finally, the constant

$$\kappa \ \stackrel{\text{def}}{=}\ \frac{e}{m \omega x_0}$$

has been defined.

These equations can be solved as follows:

$$u(t; \delta) = [u_0 \cos \delta t - v_0 \sin \delta t] e^{-t/T} + \kappa E_0 \int_0^t dt' \sin \delta(t - t') e^{-(t-t')/T},$$
$$v(t; \delta) = [u_0 \cos \delta t + v_0 \sin \delta t] e^{-t/T} - \kappa E_0 \int_0^t dt' \cos \delta(t - t') e^{-(t-t')/T}.$$

After all transients have died away, the steady-state solution takes the simple form

$$x_a(t) = \frac{e}{m} E_0 \left(\frac{e^{i\omega t}}{\omega_a^2 - \omega^2 + 2i\omega/T} + \text{c.c.}\right),$$

where "c.c." stands for the complex conjugate of the opposing term.

== Two-level atom ==
=== Semiclassical approach ===
The classical Rabi problem gives some basic results and a simple to understand picture of the issue, but in order to understand phenomena such as inversion, spontaneous emission, and the Bloch–Siegert shift, a fully quantum-mechanical treatment is necessary.

The simplest approach is through the two-level atom approximation, in which one only treats two energy levels of the atom in question. No atom with only two energy levels exists in reality, but a transition between, for example, two hyperfine states in an atom can be treated, to first approximation, as if only those two levels existed, assuming the drive is not too far off resonance.

The convenience of the two-level atom is that any two-level system evolves in essentially the same way as a spin-1/2 system, in accordance to the Bloch equations, which define the dynamics of the pseudo-spin vector in an electric field:

$$\dot{u} = -\delta v,$$
$$\dot{v} = \delta u + \kappa E w,$$
$$\dot{w} = -\kappa E v,$$

where we have made the rotating wave approximation in throwing out terms with high angular velocity (and thus small effect on the total spin dynamics over long time periods) and transformed into a set of coordinates rotating at a frequency $\omega$.

There is a clear analogy here between these equations and those that defined the evolution of the in-phase and out-of-phase components of oscillation in the classical case. Now, however, there is a third term w, which can be interpreted as the population difference between the excited and ground state (varying from −1 to represent completely in the ground state to +1, completely in the excited state). Keep in mind that for the classical case, there was a continuous energy spectrum that the atomic oscillator could occupy, while for the quantum case (as we've assumed) there are only two possible (eigen)states of the problem.

These equations can also be stated in matrix form:

$$\frac{d}{dt} \begin{bmatrix}
u \\
v \\
w \\
\end{bmatrix} =
\begin{bmatrix}
0 & -\delta & 0 \\
\delta & 0 & \kappa E \\
0 & -\kappa E & 0
\end{bmatrix}
\begin{bmatrix}
u \\
v \\
w \\
\end{bmatrix}.$$

It is noteworthy that these equations can be written as a vector precession equation:

$$\frac{d\mathbf{\rho}}{dt} = \mathbf{\Omega} \times \mathbf{\rho},$$

where $\mathbf{\rho} = (u, v, w)$ is the pseudo-spin vector, and $\mathbf{\Omega} = (-\kappa E, 0, \delta)$ acts as an effective torque.

As before, the Rabi problem is solved by assuming that the electric field E is oscillatory with constant magnitude E_{0}: $E = E_0 (e^{i\omega t} + \text{c.c.})$. In this case, the solution can be found by applying two successive rotations to the matrix equation above, of the form

$$\begin{bmatrix}
u \\ v \\ w \end{bmatrix} =
\begin{bmatrix} \cos \chi & 0 & \sin\chi \\
0 & 1 & 0 \\
-\sin\chi & 0 & \cos\chi
\end{bmatrix}
\begin{bmatrix}
u' \\ v' \\ w'
\end{bmatrix}$$

and

$$\begin{bmatrix}
u' \\ v' \\ w' \end{bmatrix} =
\begin{bmatrix}
1 & 0 & 0 \\
0 & \cos \Omega t & \sin\Omega t \\
0 & -\sin\Omega t & \cos\Omega t
\end{bmatrix}
\begin{bmatrix}
u'' \\ v'' \\ w''
\end{bmatrix},$$

where

$$\tan \chi = \frac{\delta}{\kappa E_0},$$
$$\Omega(\delta) = \sqrt{\delta^2 + (\kappa E_0)^2}.$$

Here the frequency $\Omega(\delta)$ is known as the generalized Rabi frequency, which gives the rate of precession of the pseudo-spin vector about the transformed u' axis (given by the first coordinate transformation above). As an example, if the electric field (or laser) is exactly on resonance (such that $\delta = 0$), then the pseudo-spin vector will precess about the u axis at a rate of $\kappa E_0$. If this (on-resonance) pulse is shone on a collection of atoms originally all in their ground state (w = −1) for a time $\Delta t = \pi/\kappa E_0$, then after the pulse, the atoms will now all be in their excited state (w = +1) because of the $\pi$ (or 180°) rotation about the u axis. This is known as a $\pi$-pulse and has the result of a complete inversion.

The general result is given by

$$\begin{bmatrix}
u \\ v \\ w
\end{bmatrix} =
\begin{bmatrix}
\frac{(\kappa E_0)^2 + \delta^2 \cos \Omega t}{\Omega^2} & -\frac{\delta}{\Omega} \sin{\Omega t} & -\frac{\delta \kappa E_0}{\Omega^2} (1-\cos \Omega t) \\
\frac{\delta}{\Omega}\sin\Omega t & \cos \Omega t & \frac{\kappa E_0}{\Omega}\sin \Omega t \\
\frac{\delta \kappa E_0}{\Omega^2} (1 - \cos \Omega t) & -\frac{\kappa E_0}{\Omega} \sin{\Omega t} & \frac{\delta^2 + (\kappa E_0)^2 \cos \Omega t}{\Omega^2}
\end{bmatrix}
\begin{bmatrix}
u_0 \\ v_0 \\ w_0
\end{bmatrix}.$$

The expression for the inversion w can be greatly simplified if the atom is assumed to be initially in its ground state (w_{0} = −1) with u_{0} = v_{0} = 0, in which case

$$w(t; \delta) = -1 + \frac{2(\kappa E_0)^2}{(\kappa E_0)^2 + \delta^2} \sin^2 \left(\frac{\Omega t}{2}\right).$$

== Rabi problem in time-dependent perturbation theory ==
In the quantum approach, the periodic driving force can be considered as periodic perturbation and, therefore, the problem can be solved using time-dependent perturbation theory, with

$$H(t) = H^0 + H^1(t),$$

where $H^0$ is the time-independent Hamiltonian that gives the original eigenstates, and $H^1(t)$ is the time-dependent perturbation. Assume at time $t$, we can expand the state as

$$\phi(t) = \sum_n d_n(t) e^{-i E_n t/\hbar} |n\rangle,$$

where $|n\rangle$ represents the eigenstates of the unperturbed states. For an unperturbed system, $d_n(t) = d_n(0)$ is a constant. Now, let's calculate $d_n(t)$ under a periodic perturbation $H^1(t) = H^1 e^{-i\omega t}$. Applying operator $i\hbar \partial/\partial t - H^0 - H^1$ on both sides of the previous equation, we can get

$$0 = \sum_n [i\hbar \dot d_n - H^1 e^{-i\omega t} d_n] e^{-iE^0_n t/\hbar } |n\rangle,$$

and then multiply both sides of the equation by $\langle m| e^{iE^0_m t/\hbar }$:

$$i\hbar \dot d_m = \sum_n \langle m | H^1 |n\rangle e^{i(\omega_{mn} - \omega)t} d_n.$$

When the excitation frequency is at resonance between two states $|m\rangle$ and $|n\rangle$, i.e. $\omega = \omega_{mn}$, it becomes a normal-mode problem of a two-level system, and it is easy to find that

$$d_{m,n}(t) = d_{m,n,+}(0) e^{i\Omega t} + d_{m,n,-}(0) e^{-i\Omega t},$$

where $\Omega = \frac{\langle m | H^1 |n\rangle}{\hbar}.$

The probability of being in the state m at time t is

$$P_m = d_m(t)^* d_m(t) = d_{m,-}^2(0) + d_{m,+}^2(0) + 2 d_{m,-}(0) d_{m,+}(0) \cos (2\Omega t).$$

The value of $d_{m,\pm}(0)$ depends on the initial condition of the system.

An exact solution of spin-1/2 system in an oscillating magnetic field is solved by Rabi (1937). From their work, it is clear that the Rabi oscillation frequency is proportional to the magnitude of oscillation magnetic field.

=== Quantum field theory approach ===
In Bloch's approach, the field is not quantized, and neither the resulting coherence nor the resonance is well explained.

Need work for the QFT approach, mainly Jaynes–Cummings model.

== See also ==
- Rabi cycle
- Rabi frequency
- Vacuum Rabi oscillation
