= Cavity optomechanics =

Branch of physics

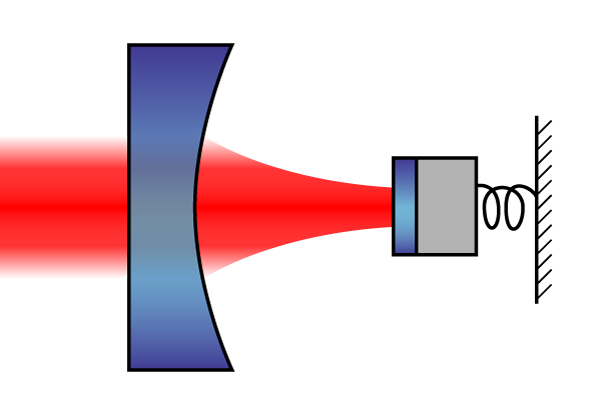
The typical model for many structures in cavity optomechanics is an optical cavity consisting of a fixed mirror and a mechanical oscillator.

Cavity optomechanics is a branch of physics which focuses on the interaction between light and mechanical objects on low-energy scales. It is a cross field of optics, quantum optics, solid-state physics and materials science. The motivation for research on cavity optomechanics comes from fundamental effects of quantum theory and gravity, as well as technological applications, such as quantum precision measurement.

The name of the field relates to the main effect of interest: the enhancement of radiation pressure interaction between light (photons) and matter using optical resonators (cavities). It first became relevant in the context of gravitational wave detection, since optomechanical effects must be taken into account in interferometric gravitational wave detectors. Furthermore, one may envision optomechanical structures to allow the realization of Schrödinger's cat. Macroscopic objects consisting of billions of atoms share collective degrees of freedom which may behave quantum mechanically (e.g. a sphere of micrometer diameter being in a spatial superposition between two different places). Such a quantum state of motion would allow researchers to experimentally investigate decoherence, which describes the transition of objects from states that are described by quantum mechanics to states that are described by Newtonian mechanics. Optomechanical structures provide new methods to test the predictions of quantum mechanics and decoherence models and could help find answers to some of the most fundamental questions in modern physics.

There is a broad range of experimental optomechanical systems which are almost equivalent in their description, but completely different in size, mass, and frequency. Cavity optomechanics was featured as the most recent "milestone of photon history" in nature photonics along well established concepts and technology like quantum information, Bell inequalities and the laser.

== Concepts of cavity optomechanics ==
=== Physical processes ===
==== Stokes and anti-Stokes scattering ====
The most elementary light–matter interaction is a light beam scattering off an arbitrary object (atom, molecule, nanobeam etc.). There is always elastic light scattering, with the outgoing light frequency identical to the incoming frequency $\omega'=\omega$. Inelastic scattering, in contrast, is accompanied by excitation or de-excitation of the material object (e.g. internal atomic transitions may be excited). However, it is always possible to have Brillouin scattering independent of the internal electronic details of atoms or molecules due to the object's mechanical vibrations:
$$\omega' = \omega \pm \omega_m,$$
where $\omega_m$ is the vibrational frequency. The vibrations gain or lose energy, respectively, for these Stokes/anti-Stokes processes, while optical sidebands are created around the incoming light frequency:
$$\omega' = \omega \mp \omega_m.$$
If Stokes and anti-Stokes scattering occur at an equal rate, the vibrations will only heat up the object. However, an optical cavity can be used to suppress the (anti-)Stokes process, which reveals the principle of the basic optomechanical setup: a laser-driven optical cavity is coupled to the mechanical vibrations of some object. The purpose of the cavity is to select optical frequencies (e.g. to suppress the Stokes process) that resonantly enhance the light intensity and to enhance the sensitivity to the mechanical vibrations. The setup displays features of a true two-way interaction between light and mechanics, which is in contrast to optical tweezers, optical lattices, or vibrational spectroscopy, where the light field controls the mechanics (or vice versa) but the loop is not closed.

==== Radiation pressure force ====
Another but equivalent way to interpret the principle of optomechanical cavities is by using the concept of radiation pressure. According to the quantum theory of light, every photon with wavenumber $k$ carries a momentum $p=\hbar k$, where $\hbar$ is the Planck constant. This means that a photon reflected off a mirror surface transfers a momentum $\Delta p=2\hbar k$ onto the mirror due to the conservation of momentum. This effect is extremely small and cannot be observed on most everyday objects; it becomes more significant when the mass of the mirror is very small and/or the number of photons is very large (i.e. high intensity of the light). Since the momentum of photons is extremely small and not enough to change the position of a suspended mirror significantly, the interaction needs to be enhanced. One possible way to do this is by using optical cavities. If a photon is enclosed between two mirrors, where one is the oscillator and the other is a heavy fixed one, it will bounce off the mirrors many times and transfer its momentum every time it hits the mirrors. The number of times a photon can transfer its momentum is directly related to the finesse of the cavity, which can be improved with highly reflective mirror surfaces. The radiation pressure of the photons does not simply shift the suspended mirror further and further away as the effect on the cavity light field must be taken into account: if the mirror is displaced, the cavity's length changes, which also alters the cavity resonance frequency. Therefore, the detuning—which determines the light amplitude inside the cavity—between the changed cavity and the unchanged laser driving frequency is modified. It determines the light amplitude inside the cavity – at smaller levels of detuning more light actually enters the cavity because it is closer to the cavity resonance frequency. Since the light amplitude, i.e. the number of photons inside the cavity, causes the radiation pressure force and consequently the displacement of the mirror, the loop is closed: the radiation pressure force effectively depends on the mirror position. Another advantage of optical cavities is that the modulation of the cavity length through an oscillating mirror can directly be seen in the spectrum of the cavity.

==== Optical spring effect ====
In this optomechanical system, the radiation pressure force is leveraged to detect a single protein molecule. Laser light interacts with a glass sphere: the radiation pressure force causes it to vibrate. The presence of a single molecule on the sphere disturbs that (thermal) vibration, and causes its resonance frequency to shift: the molecule, via the light, induces an optical spring effect. The resonance frequency shift can be read out as a displacement of the oscillator spectrum displayed on the left monitor.

Some first effects of the light on the mechanical resonator can be captured by converting the radiation pressure force into a potential,
$$\frac{d}{dx}V_\text{rad}(x) = -F(x),$$
and adding it to the intrinsic harmonic oscillator potential of the mechanical oscillator, where $F(x)$ is the slope of the radiation pressure force. This combined potential reveals the possibility of static multi-stability in the system, i.e. the potential can feature several stable minima. In addition, $F(x)$ can be understood to be a modification of the mechanical spring constant,
$$D = D_0 - \frac{dF}{dx}.$$
This effect is known as the optical spring effect (light-induced spring constant).

However, the model is incomplete as it neglects retardation effects due to the finite cavity photon decay rate $\kappa$. The force follows the motion of the mirror only with some time delay, which leads to effects like friction. For example, assume the equilibrium position sits somewhere on the rising slope of the resonance. In thermal equilibrium, there will be oscillations around this position that do not follow the shape of the resonance because of retardation. The consequence of this delayed radiation force during one cycle of oscillation is that work is performed, in this particular case it is negative,$\oint F \, dx < 0$, i.e. the radiation force extracts mechanical energy (there is extra, light-induced damping). This can be used to cool down the mechanical motion and is referred to as optical or optomechanical cooling. It is important for reaching the quantum regime of the mechanical oscillator where thermal noise effects on the device become negligible. Similarly, if the equilibrium position sits on the falling slope of the cavity resonance, the work is positive and the mechanical motion is amplified. In this case the extra, light-induced damping is negative and leads to amplification of the mechanical motion (heating). Radiation-induced damping of this kind has first been observed in pioneering experiments by Braginsky and coworkers in 1970.

==== Quantized energy transfer ====
Another explanation for the basic optomechanical effects of cooling and amplification can be given in a quantized picture: by detuning the incoming light from the cavity resonance to the red sideband, the photons can only enter the cavity if they take phonons with energy $\hbar\omega_m$ from the mechanics; it effectively cools the device until a balance with heating mechanisms from the environment and laser noise is reached. Similarly, it is also possible to heat structures (amplify the mechanical motion) by detuning the driving laser to the blue side; in this case the laser photons scatter into a cavity photon and create an additional phonon in the mechanical oscillator.

The principle can be summarized as: phonons are converted into photons when cooled and vice versa in amplification.

=== Three regimes of operation: cooling, heating, resonance ===
The basic behaviour of the optomechanical system can generally be divided into different regimes, depending on the detuning between the laser frequency and the cavity resonance frequency $\Delta = \omega_L - \omega_\text{cav}$:

- Red-detuned regime, $\Delta<0$ (most prominent effects on the red sideband, $\Delta=-\omega_m$): In this regime state exchange between two resonant oscillators can occur (i.e. a beam-splitter in quantum optics language). This can be used for state transfer between phonons and photons (which requires the so-called "strong coupling regime") or the above-mentioned optical cooling.
- Blue-detuned regime, $\Delta>0$ (most prominent effects on the blue sideband, $\Delta=+\omega_m$): This regime describes "two-mode squeezing". It can be used to achieve quantum entanglement, squeezing, and mechanical "lasing" (amplification of the mechanical motion to self-sustained optomechanical oscillations / limit cycle oscillations), if the growth of the mechanical energy overwhelms the intrinsic losses (mainly mechanical friction).
- On-resonance regime, $\Delta=0$: In this regime the cavity is simply operated as an interferometer to read the mechanical motion.

The optical spring effect also depends on the detuning. It can be observed for high levels of detuning ($\Delta\gg\omega_m,\kappa$) and its strength varies with detuning and the laser drive.

=== Mathematical treatment ===
==== Hamiltonian ====
The standard optomechanical setup is a Fabry–Pérot cavity, where one mirror is movable and thus provides an additional mechanical degree of freedom. This system can be mathematically described by a single optical cavity mode coupled to a single mechanical mode. The coupling originates from the radiation pressure of the light field that eventually moves the mirror, which changes the cavity length and resonance frequency. The optical mode is driven by an external laser. This system can be described by the following effective Hamiltonian:
$$H_\text{tot} = \hbar \omega_\text{cav}(x) a^\dagger a + \hbar \omega_m b^\dagger b + i \hbar E \left( a e^{i\omega_L t} - a^\dagger e^{-i\omega_L t}\right)$$
where $a$ and $b$ are the bosonic annihilation operators of the given cavity mode and the mechanical resonator respectively, $\omega_\text{cav}$ is the frequency of the optical mode, $x$ is the position of the mechanical resonator, $\omega_m$ is the mechanical mode frequency, $\omega_L$ is the driving laser frequency, and $E$ is the amplitude. It satisfies the commutation relations
$$[a, a^\dagger] = [b, b^\dagger] = 1.$$
$\omega_{cav}$ is now dependent on $x$. The last term describes the driving, given by
$$E = \sqrt{\frac{P \kappa}{\hbar \omega_L}}$$
where $P$ is the input power coupled to the optical mode under consideration and $\kappa$ its linewidth. The system is coupled to the environment so the full treatment of the system would also include optical and mechanical dissipation (denoted by $\kappa$ and $\Gamma$ respectively) and the corresponding noise entering the system.

The standard optomechanical Hamiltonian is obtained by getting rid of the explicit time dependence of the laser driving term and separating the optomechanical interaction from the free optical oscillator. This is done by switching into a reference frame rotating at the laser frequency $\omega_L$ (in which case the optical mode annihilation operator undergoes the transformation $a \rightarrow a e^{-i\omega_L t}$) and applying a Taylor expansion on $\omega_\text{cav}$. Quadratic and higher-order coupling terms are usually neglected, such that the standard Hamiltonian becomes
$$H_\text{tot} = -\hbar \Delta a^\dagger a + \hbar \omega_m b^\dagger b - \hbar g_0  a^\dagger a \frac{x}{x_\text{zpf}}+ i\hbar E \left( a - a^\dagger \right)$$
where $\Delta = \omega_L - \omega_\text{cav}$ the laser detuning and the position operator $x = x_\text{zpf} (b + b^\dagger)$. The first two terms ($-\hbar \Delta a^\dagger a$ and $\hbar \omega_m b^\dagger b$) are the free optical and mechanical Hamiltonians respectively. The third term contains the optomechanical interaction, where $g_0 = \left.\tfrac{d\omega_\text{cav}}{dx}\right|_{x=0} x_\text{zpf}$ is the single-photon optomechanical coupling strength (also known as the bare optomechanical coupling). It determines the amount of cavity resonance frequency shift if the mechanical oscillator is displaced by the zero point uncertainty $x_\text{zpf} = \sqrt{\hbar / 2m_\text{eff} \omega_m}$, where $m_\text{eff}$ is the effective mass of the mechanical oscillator. It is sometimes more convenient to use the frequency pull parameter, or $G = \frac{g_0}{x_\text{zpf}}$, to determine the frequency change per displacement of the mirror.

For example, the optomechanical coupling strength of a Fabry–Pérot cavity of length $L$ with a moving end-mirror can be directly determined from the geometry to be $g_0 = \frac{\omega_\text{cav}(0) x_\text{zpf}}{L}$.

This standard Hamiltonian $H_\text{tot}$ is based on the assumption that only one optical and mechanical mode interact. In principle, each optical cavity supports an infinite number of modes and mechanical oscillators which have more than a single oscillation/vibration mode. The validity of this approach relies on the possibility to tune the laser in such a way that it only populates a single optical mode (implying that the spacing between the cavity modes needs to be sufficiently large). Furthermore, scattering of photons to other modes is supposed to be negligible, which holds if the mechanical (motional) sidebands of the driven mode do not overlap with other cavity modes; i.e. if the mechanical mode frequency is smaller than the typical separation of the optical modes.

==== Linearization ====
The single-photon optomechanical coupling strength $g_0$ is usually a small frequency, much smaller than the cavity decay rate $\kappa$, but the effective optomechanical coupling can be enhanced by increasing the drive power. With a strong enough drive, the dynamics of the system can be considered as quantum fluctuations around a classical steady state, i.e. $a = \alpha + \delta a$, where $\alpha$ is the mean light field amplitude and $\delta a$ denotes the fluctuations. Expanding the photon number $a^\dagger a$, the term $~\alpha^2$ can be omitted as it leads to a constant radiation pressure force which simply shifts the resonator's equilibrium position. The linearized optomechanical Hamiltonian $H_\text{lin}$ can be obtained by neglecting the second order term $~\delta a^\dagger \delta a$:
$$H_\text{lin} = -\hbar\Delta \delta a^\dagger \delta a + \hbar\omega_m b^\dagger b - \hbar g (\delta a + \delta a^\dagger)(b + b^\dagger)$$
where $g = g_0 \alpha$. While this Hamiltonian is a quadratic function, it is considered "linearized" because it leads to linear equations of motion. It is a valid description of many experiments, where $g_0$ is typically very small and needs to be enhanced by the driving laser. For a realistic description, dissipation should be added to both the optical and the mechanical oscillator. The driving term from the standard Hamiltonian is not part of the linearized Hamiltonian, since it is the source of the classical light amplitude $\alpha$ around which the linearization was executed.

With a particular choice of detuning, different phenomena can be observed (see also the section about physical processes). The clearest distinction can be made between the following three cases:

- $\Delta\approx-\omega_m$: a rotating wave approximation of the linearized Hamiltonian, where one omits all non-resonant terms, reduces the coupling Hamiltonian to a beamsplitter operator, $H_\text{int} = \hbar g_0(\delta a^\dagger b + \delta a b^\dagger)$. This approximation works best on resonance; i.e. if the detuning becomes exactly equal to the negative mechanical frequency. Negative detuning (red detuning of the laser from the cavity resonance) by an amount equal to the mechanical mode frequency favors the anti-Stokes sideband and leads to a net cooling of the resonator. Laser photons absorb energy from the mechanical oscillator by annihilating phonons in order to become resonant with the cavity.
- $\Delta \approx \omega_m$: a rotating wave approximation of the linearized Hamiltonian leads to other resonant terms. The coupling Hamiltonian takes the form $H_\text{int} = \hbar g_0(\delta a b + \delta a^\dagger b^\dagger)$, which is proportional to the two-mode squeezing operator. Therefore, two-mode squeezing and entanglement between the mechanical and optical modes can be observed with this parameter choice. Positive detuning (blue detuning of the laser from the cavity resonance) can also lead to instability. The Stokes sideband is enhanced, i.e. the laser photons shed energy, increasing the number of phonons and becoming resonant with the cavity in the process.
- $\Delta = 0$: In this case of driving on-resonance, all the terms in $H_\text{int} = \hbar g_0 (\delta a + \delta a^\dagger) (b+b^\dagger)$ must be considered. The optical mode experiences a shift proportional to the mechanical displacement, which translates into a phase shift of the light transmitted through (or reflected off) the cavity. The cavity serves as an interferometer augmented by the factor of the optical finesse and can be used to measure very small displacements. This setup has enabled LIGO to detect gravitational waves.

==== Equations of motion ====
From the linearized Hamiltonian, the so-called linearized quantum Langevin equations, which govern the dynamics of the optomechanical system, can be derived when dissipation and noise terms to the Heisenberg equations of motion are added.
$$\begin{align}
\delta \dot{a} &=  (i \Delta-\kappa/2) \delta a + i g (b+b^\dagger) - \sqrt{\kappa} a_\text{in} \\[1ex]
\dot b &= -(i\omega_m+\Gamma/2)b +i g (\delta a+\delta a^\dagger) - \sqrt{\Gamma}b_\text{in}
\end{align}$$

Here $a_\text{in}$ and $b_\text{in}$ are the input noise operators (either quantum or thermal noise) and $-\kappa \delta a$ and $-\Gamma \delta p$ are the corresponding dissipative terms. For optical photons, thermal noise can be neglected due to the high frequencies, such that the optical input noise can be described by quantum noise only; this does not apply to microwave implementations of the optomechanical system. For the mechanical oscillator thermal noise has to be taken into account and is the reason why many experiments are placed in additional cooling environments to lower the ambient temperature.

These first order differential equations can be solved easily when they are rewritten in frequency space (i.e. a Fourier transform is applied).

Two main effects of the light on the mechanical oscillator can then be expressed in the following ways:

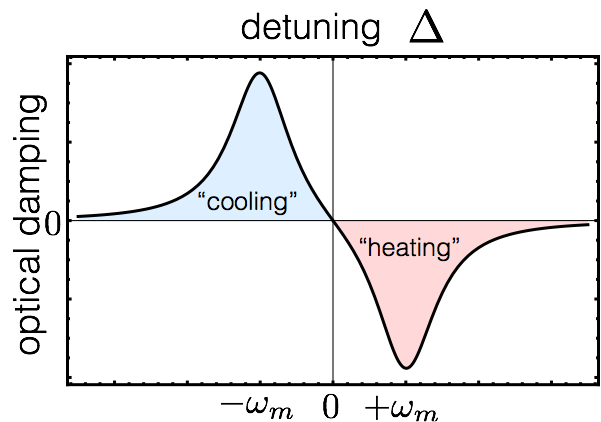
The optically induced damping of the mechanical oscillator that adds to the intrinsic mechanical damping.

$$\delta\omega_m = g^2\left(\frac{\Delta-\omega_m}{\kappa^2/4+(\Delta-\omega_m)^2}+\frac{\Delta+\omega_m}{\kappa^2/4+(\Delta+\omega_m)^2}\right)$$

The equation above is termed the optical-spring effect and may lead to significant frequency shifts in the case of low-frequency oscillators, such as pendulum mirrors. In the case of higher resonance frequencies ($\omega_m \gtrsim 1$ MHz), it does not significantly alter the frequency. For a harmonic oscillator, the relation between a frequency shift and a change in the spring constant originates from Hooke's law.
$$\Gamma^\text{eff} = \Gamma + g^2\left(\frac{\kappa}{\kappa^2/4+(\Delta+\omega_m)^2} - \frac{\kappa}{\kappa^2/4+(\Delta-\omega_m)^2}\right)$$

The equation above shows optical damping, i.e. the intrinsic mechanical damping $\Gamma$ becomes stronger (or weaker) due to the optomechanical interaction. From the formula, in the case of negative detuning and large coupling, mechanical damping can be greatly increased, which corresponds to the cooling of the mechanical oscillator. In the case of positive detuning the optomechanical interaction reduces effective damping. Instability can occur when the effective damping drops below zero ($\Gamma^\text{eff} < 0$), which means that it turns into an overall amplification rather than a damping of the mechanical oscillator.

=== Important parameter regimes ===
The most basic regimes in which the optomechanical system can be operated are defined by the laser detuning $\Delta$ and described above. The resulting phenomena are either cooling or heating of the mechanical oscillator. However, additional parameters determine what effects can actually be observed.

The good/bad cavity regime (also called the resolved/unresolved sideband regime) relates the mechanical frequency to the optical linewidth. The good cavity regime (resolved sideband limit) is of experimental relevance since it is a necessary requirement to achieve ground state cooling of the mechanical oscillator, i.e. cooling to an average mechanical occupation number below $1$. The term "resolved sideband regime" refers to the possibility of distinguishing the motional sidebands from the cavity resonance, which is true if the linewidth of the cavity, $\kappa$, is smaller than the distance from the cavity resonance to the sideband ($\omega_m$). This requirement leads to a condition for the so-called sideband parameter: $\omega_m/\kappa\gg1$. If $\omega_m/\kappa\ll1$ the system resides in the bad cavity regime (unresolved sideband limit), where the motional sideband lies within the peak of the cavity resonance. In the unresolved sideband regime, many motional sidebands can be included in the broad cavity linewidth, which allows a single photon to create more than one phonon, which leads to greater amplification of the mechanical oscillator.

Another distinction can be made depending on the optomechanical coupling strength. If the (enhanced) optomechanical coupling becomes larger than the cavity linewidth ($g\geq\kappa$), a strong-coupling regime is achieved. There the optical and mechanical modes hybridize and normal-mode splitting occurs. This regime must be distinguished from the (experimentally much more challenging) single-photon strong-coupling regime, where the bare optomechanical coupling becomes of the order of the cavity linewidth, $g_0\geq\kappa$. Effects of the full non-linear interaction described by $\hbar g_0 a^\dagger a (b+b^\dagger)$ only become observable in this regime. For example, it is a precondition to create non-Gaussian states with the optomechanical system. Typical experiments currently operate in the linearized regime (small $g_0\ll\kappa$) and only investigate effects of the linearized Hamiltonian.

== Experimental realizations ==
=== Setup ===
The strength of the optomechanical Hamiltonian is the large range of experimental implementations to which it can be applied, which results in wide parameter ranges for the optomechanical parameters. For example, the size of optomechanical systems can be on the order of micrometers or in the case for LIGO, kilometers. (although LIGO is dedicated to the detection of gravitational waves and not the investigation of optomechanics specifically).

Examples of real optomechanical implementations are:

- Cavities with a moving mirror: the archetype of an optomechanical system. The light is reflected from the mirrors and transfers momentum onto the movable one, which in turn changes the cavity resonance frequency.
- Membrane-in-the-middle system: a micromechanical membrane is brought into a cavity consisting of fixed massive mirrors. The membrane takes the role of the mechanical oscillator. Depending on the positioning of the membrane inside the cavity, this system behaves like the standard optomechanical system.
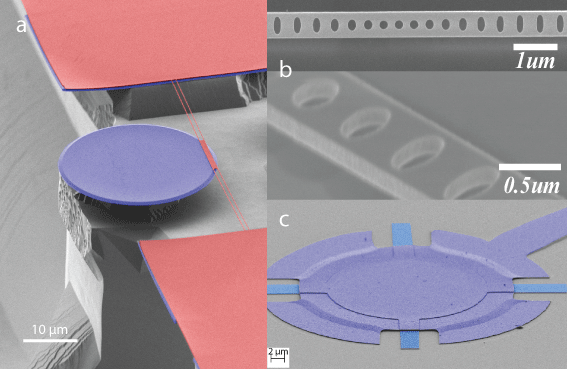
  Three types of dispersively coupled cavity optomechanical systems are shown. (a) A high-stress silicon nitride nanobeam coupled to a whispering gallery mode microdisk by dipole interaction. (b) An optomechanical crystal with colocalized mechanical and optical modes. (c) A mechanically compliant aluminum capacitor used to form a superconducting LC oscillator.
- Levitated system: an optically levitated nanoparticle is brought into a cavity consisting of fixed massive mirrors. The levitated nanoparticle takes the role of the mechanical oscillator. Depending on the positioning of the particle inside the cavity, this system behaves like the standard optomechanical system.
- Microtoroids that support an optical whispering gallery mode can be either coupled to a mechanical mode of the toroid or evanescently to a nanobeam that is brought in proximity.
- Optomechanical crystal structures: patterned dielectrics or metamaterials can confine optical and/or mechanical (acoustic) modes. If the patterned material is designed to confine light, it is called a photonic crystal cavity. If it is designed to confine sound, it is called a phononic crystal cavity. Either can be used respectively as the optical or mechanical component. Hybrid crystals, which confine both sound and light to the same area, are especially useful, as they form a complete optomechanical system.
- Electromechanical implementations of an optomechanical system use superconducting LC circuits with a mechanically compliant capacitance like a membrane with metallic coating or a tiny capacitor plate glued onto it. By using movable capacitor plates, mechanical motion (physical displacement) of the plate or membrane changes the capacitance $C$, which transforms mechanical oscillation into electrical oscillation. LC oscillators have resonances in the microwave frequency range; therefore, LC circuits are also termed microwave resonators. The physics is exactly the same as in optical cavities but the range of parameters is different because microwave radiation has a larger wavelength than optical light or infrared laser light.

A purpose of studying different designs of the same system is the different parameter regimes that are accessible by different setups and their different potential to be converted into tools of commercial use.

=== Measurement ===
The optomechanical system can be measured by using a scheme like homodyne detection. Either the light of the driving laser is measured, or a two-mode scheme is followed where a strong laser is used to drive the optomechanical system into the state of interest and a second laser is used for the read-out of the state of the system. This second "probe" laser is typically weak, i.e. its optomechanical interaction can be neglected compared to the effects caused by the strong "pump" laser.

The optical output field can also be measured with single photon detectors to achieve photon counting statistics.

== Relation to fundamental research ==
One of the questions which are still subject to current debate is the exact mechanism of decoherence. In the Schrödinger's cat thought experiment, the cat would never be seen in a quantum state: there needs to be something like a collapse of the quantum wave functions, which brings it from a quantum state to a pure classical state. The question is where the boundary lies between objects with quantum properties and classical objects. Taking spatial superpositions as an example, there might be a size limit to objects which can be brought into superpositions, there might be a limit to the spatial separation of the centers of mass of a superposition or even a limit to the superposition of gravitational fields and its impact on small test masses. Those predictions can be checked with large mechanical structures that can be manipulated at the quantum level.

Some easier to check predictions of quantum mechanics are the prediction of negative Wigner functions for certain quantum states, measurement precision beyond the standard quantum limit using squeezed states of light, or the asymmetry of the sidebands in the spectrum of a cavity near the quantum ground state.

== Applications ==
Years before cavity optomechanics gained the status of an independent field of research, many of its techniques were already used in gravitational wave detectors where it is necessary to measure displacements of mirrors on the order of the Planck scale. Even if these detectors do not address the measurement of quantum effects, they encounter related issues (photon shot noise) and use similar tricks (squeezed coherent states) to enhance the precision. Further applications include the development of quantum memory for quantum computers, high precision sensors (e.g. acceleration sensors) and quantum transducers e.g. between the optical and the microwave domain (taking advantage of the fact that the mechanical oscillator can easily couple to both frequency regimes).

== Related fields and expansions ==
In addition to the standard cavity optomechanics explained above, there are variations of the simplest model:

- Pulsed optomechanics: the continuous laser driving is replaced by pulsed laser driving. It is useful for creating entanglement and allows backaction-evading measurements.
- Quadratic coupling: a system with quadratic optomechanical coupling can be investigated beyond the linear coupling term $g_0 = \left.\tfrac{d\omega_\text{cav}(x)}{dx}\right|_{x=0} x_\text{zpf}$. The interaction Hamiltonian would then feature a term $\hbar g_\text{quad} a^\dagger a(b + b^\dagger)^2$ with $g_\text{sq} = \frac{1}{2} \left.\tfrac{d^2\omega_\text{cav}(x)}{dx^2}\right|_{x=0} x_\text{zpf}^2$. In membrane-in-the-middle setups it is possible to achieve quadratic coupling in the absence of linear coupling by positioning the membrane at an extremum of the standing wave inside the cavity. One possible application is to carry out a quantum nondemolition measurement of the phonon number.
- Reversed dissipation regime: in the standard optomechanical system the mechanical damping is much smaller than the optical damping. A system where this hierarchy is reversed can be engineered; i.e. the optical damping is much smaller than the mechanical damping ($\kappa\ll\Gamma$). Within the linearized regime, symmetry implies an inversion of the above described effects; For example, cooling of the mechanical oscillator in the standard optomechanical system is replaced by cooling of the optical oscillator in a system with reversed dissipation hierarchy. This effect was also seen in optical fiber loops in the 1970s.
- Dissipative coupling: the coupling between optics and mechanics arises from a position-dependent optical dissipation rate $\kappa(x)$ instead of a position-dependent cavity resonance frequency $\omega_{cav}$, which changes the interaction Hamiltonian and alters many effects of the standard optomechanical system. For example, this scheme allows the mechanical resonator to cool to its ground state without the requirement of the good cavity regime.

Extensions to the standard optomechanical system include coupling to more and physically different systems:

- Optomechanical arrays: coupling several optomechanical systems to each other (e.g. using evanescent coupling of the optical modes) allows multi-mode phenomena like synchronization to be studied. So far many theoretical predictions have been made, but only few experiments exist. The first optomechanical array (with more than two coupled systems) consists of seven optomechanical systems.
- Hybrid systems: an optomechanical system can be coupled to a system of a different nature (e.g. a cloud of ultracold atoms and a two-level system), which can lead to new effects on both the optomechanical and the additional system.

Cavity optomechanics is closely related to trapped ion physics and Bose–Einstein condensates. These systems share very similar Hamiltonians, but have fewer particles (about 10 for ion traps and 10^{5}–10^{8} for Bose–Einstein condensates) interacting with the field of light. It is also related to the field of cavity quantum electrodynamics.

== See also ==
- Quantum harmonic oscillator
- Optical cavity
- Laser cooling
- Coherent control
