= Rabi resonance method =

Technique for measuring nuclear spin

Rabi resonance method is a technique developed by Isidor Isaac Rabi for measuring the nuclear spin, in which an atom is placed in a static magnetic field and a perpendicular rotating magnetic field.

== Theory ==
When only the static magnetic field (B_{0}) is turned on, the spin will precess around it with Larmor frequency ν_{0} and the corresponding angular frequency is ω_{0}.

According to mechanics, the equation of motion of the spin J is:

$$\frac {d \vec {J}}{d t} = \vec{\mu} \times \vec {B}$$

$$\vec{\mu} = g \frac {\mu_B} {\hbar} \vec {J}  = \gamma \vec {J}$$

where μ is the magnetic moment.

g is g-factor, which is dimensionless and reflecting the environmental effect on the spin.

Solving gives the angular frequency (Larmor frequency) with the magnetic field pointing on z-axis:

$$\omega_0  =  -  \gamma B_0$$

The minus sign is necessary. It reflects that the J is rotating in left-hand when the thumb is pointing as the H field.

when turned on the rotating magnetic field (B_{R}), with angular frequency ω. In the rotating frame of the rotating field, the equation of motion is:

$$\frac {d \vec {J_R }}{d t} = \frac {d \vec {J}}{d t} - \vec {J} \times  \vec{\omega}$$

or

$$\frac {d \vec {J_R}}{d t} =  \hbar \vec {J} \times (\vec {B_0} + \vec{B_R}) -  \vec {J} \times  \vec{\omega}$$

if $\gamma B_0 = \omega_0$, the static field is cancelled, and the spin now precesses around H_{R} with angular frequency Rabi frequency

$$\omega_R = \hbar B_R$$

Since the rotating field is perpendicular to the static field, the spin in rotating frame is now able to flip between up and down.

By sweeping ω_{R}, one can obtain a maximum flipping and determine the magnetic moment.

== Experiment ==
The experiment setup contains 3 parts: an inhomogeneous magnetic field in front, the rotating field at the middle, and another inhomogeneous magnetic field at the end.

Atoms after passing the first inhomogeneous field will split into 2 beams corresponding the spin up and spin down state. Select one beam (spin up state, for example) and let it pass the rotating field. If the rotating field has frequency (ω) equal to the Larmor frequency, it will produce a high intensity of the other beam (spin down state). By sweeping the frequency to obtain a maximum intensity, one can find out the Larmor frequency and the magnetic moment of the atom.

== References and notes ==
https://web.archive.org/web/20160325004825/https://www.colorado.edu/physics/phys7550/phys7550_sp07/extras/Ramsey90_RMP.pdf

== See also ==
- Rabi frequency
- Rabi cycle
- Rabi problem
