= Jaynes–Cummings model =

Model in quantum optics

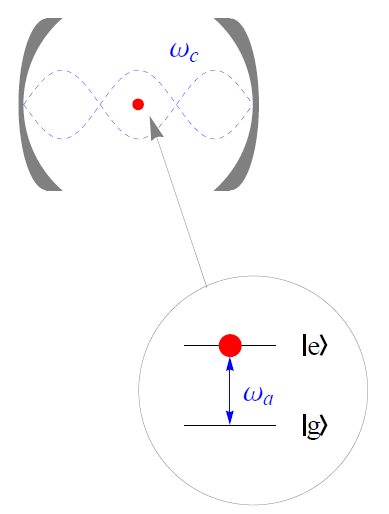
Illustration of the Jaynes–Cummings model. An atom in an optical cavity is shown as a red dot on the top left. The energy levels of the atom that couple to the field mode within the cavity are shown in the circle on the bottom right. Transfer between the two states causes photon emission (absorption) by the atom into (out of) the cavity mode.

In quantum optics, the Jaynes–Cummings model (sometimes abbreviated JCM) is a theoretical model that describes the system of a two-level atom interacting with a quantized mode of an optical cavity (or a bosonic field). The model assumes the rotating-wave approximation, neglects dissipation initially, and treats only a single field mode and a two-level atom, with or without the presence of light (in the form of a bath of electromagnetic radiation that can cause spontaneous emission and absorption). It was originally developed to study the interaction of atoms with the quantized electromagnetic field in order to investigate the phenomena of spontaneous emission and absorption of photons in a cavity. It is named after Edwin Thompson Jaynes and Fred Cummings in the 1960s and was confirmed experimentally in 1987.

The Jaynes–Cummings model is of great interest to atomic physics, quantum optics, solid-state physics and quantum information circuits, both experimentally and theoretically. Journal special issues have commemorated the 50th anniversary, (which contains numerous relevant articles, including two interesting editorials, one by Cummings), and 60th anniversary. It also has applications in coherent control and quantum information processing.

== History ==
=== 1963: Jaynes and Cummings ===
The model was originally developed in a 1963 article by Edwin Jaynes and Fred Cummings to elucidate the effects of giving a fully quantum mechanical treatment to the behavior of atoms interacting with an electromagnetic field. In order to simplify the mathematics and allow for a tractable calculation, Jaynes and Cummings restricted their attention to the interaction of an atom with a single mode of a quantised electromagnetic field. (See below for further mathematical details.)

This approach is in contrast to the earlier semi-classical method, in which only the dynamics of the atom are treated quantum mechanically, while the field with which it interacts is assumed to behave according to classical electromagnetic theory. The quantum mechanical treatment of the field in the Jaynes–Cummings model reveals a number of novel features, including:

- The existence of Rabi oscillations between the states of the two-level system as it interacts with the quantum field. This was originally believed to be a purely quantum mechanical effect, although a semi-classical explanation for it was later provided in terms of linear dispersion and absorption
- A ladder of quantized energy levels, called the Jaynes–Cummings ladder, that scales in energy non-linearly as $\sqrt{n}$ where $n$ is the total number of quanta in the coupled system. This quantization of energies and non-linear scaling is purely quantum mechanical in nature.
- The collapse and subsequent revivals of the probability to detect the two-level system in a given state when the field is initially in a coherent state. While the collapse has a simple classical explanation, the revivals can only be explained by the discreteness of the energy spectrum due to the quantum nature of the field.

To realize the dynamics predicted by the Jaynes–Cummings model experimentally requires a quantum mechanical resonator with a very high quality factor so that the transitions between the states in the two-level system (typically two energy sub-levels in an atom) are coupled very strongly by the interaction of the atom with the field mode. This simultaneously suppresses any coupling between other sub-levels in atom and coupling to other modes of the field, and thus makes any losses small enough to observe the dynamics predicted by the Jaynes–Cummings model. Because of the difficulty in realizing such an apparatus, the model remained a mathematical curiosity for quite some time. In 1985, several groups using Rydberg atoms along with a maser in a microwave cavity demonstrated the predicted Rabi oscillations. However, as noted before, this effect was later found to have a semi-classical explanation.

=== 1987: Rempe, Walther and Klein ===
It was not until 1987 that Gerhard Rempe, Herbert Walther, and Norbert Klein were finally able to use a single-atom maser to demonstrate the revivals of probabilities predicted by the model. Before that time, research groups were unable to build experimental setups capable of enhancing the coupling of an atom with a single field mode, simultaneously suppressing other modes. Experimentally, the quality factor of the cavity must be high enough to consider the dynamics of the system as equivalent to the dynamics of a single mode field. This successful demonstration of dynamics that could only be explained by a quantum mechanical model of the field spurred further development of high quality cavities for use in this research.

With the advent of one-atom masers it was possible to study the interaction of a single atom (usually a Rydberg atom) with a single resonant mode of the electromagnetic field in a cavity from an experimental point of view, and study different aspects of the Jaynes–Cummings model.

It was found that an hourglass geometry could be used to maximize the volume occupied by the mode, while simultaneously maintaining a high quality factor in order to maximize coupling strength, and thus better approximate the parameters of the model. To observe strong atom-field coupling in visible light frequencies, hour-glass-type optical modes can be helpful because of their large mode volume that eventually coincides with a strong field inside the cavity. A quantum dot inside a photonic crystal nano-cavity is also a promising system for observing collapse and revival of Rabi cycles in the visible light frequencies.

=== Further developments ===
Many recent experiments have focused on the application of the model to systems with potential applications in quantum information processing and coherent control. Various experiments have demonstrated the dynamics of the Jaynes–Cummings model in the coupling of a quantum dot to the modes of a micro-cavity, potentially allowing it to be applied in a physical system of much smaller size. Other experiments have focused on demonstrating the non-linear nature of the Jaynes–Cummings ladder of energy levels by direct spectroscopic observation. These experiments have found direct evidence for the non-linear behavior predicted from the quantum nature of the field in both superconducting circuits containing an artificial atom coupled to a very high quality oscillator in the form of a superconducting RLC circuit, and in a collection of Rydberg atoms coupled via their spins. In the latter case, the presence or absence of a collective Rydberg excitation in the ensemble serves the role of the two level system, while the role of the bosonic field mode is played by the total number of spin flips that take place.

Theoretical work has extended the original model to include the effects of dissipation and damping, typically via a phenomenological approach. Proposed extensions have also incorporated the inclusion of multiple modes of the quantum field, allowing for coupling to additional energy levels within the atom, or the presence of multiple atoms interacting with the same field. Some attempt has also been made to go beyond the so-called rotating-wave approximation that is usually employed (see the mathematical derivation below). The coupling of a single quantum field mode with multiple ($N>1$) two-state subsystems (equivalent to spins higher than 1/2) is known as the Dicke model or the Tavis–Cummings model. For example, it applies to a high quality resonant cavity containing multiple identical atoms with transitions near the cavity resonance, or a resonator coupled to multiple quantum dots on a superconducting circuit. It reduces to the Jaynes–Cummings model for the case $N=1$.

The model provides the possibility to realize several exotic theoretical possibilities in an experimental setting. For example, it was realized that during the periods of collapsed Rabi oscillations, the atom-cavity system exists in a quantum superposition state on a macroscopic scale. Such a state is sometimes referred to as a Schrödinger cat, since it allows the exploration of the counter intuitive effects of how quantum entanglement manifests in macroscopic systems. It can also be used to model how quantum information is transferred in a quantum field.

== Mathematical formulation 1 ==
The Hamiltonian that describes the full system,
$$\hat{H} = \hat{H}_{\text{field}} +\hat{H}_{\text{atom}} +\hat{H}_{\text{int}}$$
consists of the free field Hamiltonian, the atomic excitation Hamiltonian, and the Jaynes–Cummings interaction Hamiltonian:
$$\begin{align}
\hat{H}_\text{field} &= \hbar \omega_c \hat{a}^{\dagger}\hat{a}\\
\hat{H}_\text{atom} &= \hbar \omega_a \frac{\hat{\sigma}_z}{2}\\
\hat{H}_\text{int} &= \frac{\hbar \Omega}{2} \hat{E} \hat{S}.
\end{align}$$

Here, for convenience, the vacuum field energy is set to $0$.

For deriving the JCM interaction Hamiltonian the quantized radiation field is taken to consist of a single bosonic mode with the field operator $\hat{E} = E_\text{ZPF}\left( \hat{a} +\hat{a}^{\dagger}\right)$, where the operators $\hat{a}^{\dagger}$ and $\hat{a}$ are the bosonic creation and annihilation operators and $\omega_c$ is the angular frequency of the mode. On the other hand, the two-level atom is equivalent to a spin-half whose state can be described using a three-dimensional Bloch vector. (It should be understood that "two-level atom" here is not an actual atom with spin, but rather a generic two-level quantum system whose Hilbert space is isomorphic to a spin-half.) The atom is coupled to the field through its polarization operator $\hat{S} = \hat{\sigma}_+ +\hat{\sigma}_-$. The operators $\hat{\sigma}_+ = |e \rangle \langle g |$ and $\hat{\sigma}_- = |g \rangle \langle e |$ are the raising and lowering operators of the atom. The operator $\hat{\sigma}_z = |e \rangle \langle e | - |g \rangle \langle g |$ is the atomic inversion operator, and $\omega_a$ is the atomic transition frequency.

=== Jaynes–Cummings Hamiltonian 1 ===
Moving from the Schrödinger picture into the interaction picture (a.k.a. rotating frame) defined by the choice $\hat{H}_0 = \hat{H}_{\text{field}} + \hat{H}_{\text{atom}}$, we obtain
$$\hat{H}_\text{int}(t) = \frac{\hbar \Omega}{2} \left(\hat{a}\hat{\sigma}_{-} e^{-i(\omega_c+\omega_a)t}
+\hat{a}^{\dagger}\hat{\sigma}_{+}e^{i(\omega_c+\omega_a)t}
+\hat{a}\hat{\sigma}_{+} e^{i (-\omega_c+\omega_a) t}
+\hat{a}^{\dagger}\hat{\sigma}_{-} e^{-i (-\omega_c+\omega_a) t}\right).$$

This Hamiltonian contains both quickly $(\omega_c + \omega_a)$ and slowly $(\omega_c - \omega_a)$ oscillating components. To get a solvable model, the quickly oscillating "counter-rotating" terms, $(\omega_c + \omega_a)$, are ignored. This is referred to as the rotating wave approximation, and it is valid since the fast oscillating term couples states of comparatively large energy difference: when the difference in energy is much larger than the coupling, the mixing of these states will be small, or put differently, the coupling is responsible for very little population transfer between the states. Transforming back into the Schrödinger picture the JCM Hamiltonian is thus written as
$$\hat{H}_{\text{JC}} = \hbar \omega_c \hat{a}^{\dagger}\hat{a}
+\hbar \omega_a \frac{\hat{\sigma}_z}{2}
+\frac{\hbar \Omega}{2} \left(\hat{a}\hat{\sigma}_+
+\hat{a}^{\dagger}\hat{\sigma}_-\right).$$

=== Eigenstates ===
It is possible, and often very helpful, to write the Hamiltonian of the full system as a sum of two commuting parts:
$$\hat{H}_\text{JC} = \hat{H}_\text{I} +\hat{H}_\text{II},$$
where
$$\begin{align}
\hat{H}_\text{I}  &= \hbar \omega_c \left(\hat{a}^{\dagger}\hat{a} +\frac{\hat{\sigma}_z}{2}\right)\\
\hat{H}_\text{II} &= \hbar \delta \frac{\hat{\sigma}_z}{2}
+\frac{\hbar \Omega}{2} \left(\hat{a}\hat{\sigma}_+
+\hat{a}^{\dagger}\hat{\sigma}_-\right)
\end{align}$$
with $\delta = \omega_a - \omega_c$ called the detuning (frequency) between the field and the two-level system.

The eigenstates of $\hat{H}_{I}$, being of tensor product form, are easily solved and denoted by $|n+1,g\rangle, |n,e\rangle$, where $n \in \mathbb{N}$ denotes the number of radiation quanta in the mode.

As the states $|\psi_{1n}\rangle := |n,e\rangle$ and $|\psi_{2n}\rangle := |n+1,g\rangle$ are degenerate with respect to $\hat{H}_{I}$ for all $n$, it is enough to diagonalize $\hat{H}_{\text{JC}}$ in the subspaces $\operatorname{span} \{ |\psi_{1n}\rangle ,|\psi_{2n}\rangle\}$. The matrix elements of $\hat{H}_{\text{JC}}$ in this subspace, ${H}^{(n)}_{ij} := \langle\psi_{in}|\hat{H}_{\text{JC}}|\psi_{jn}\rangle,$ read
$$H^{(n)} = \hbar
\begin{pmatrix}
n \omega_c +\frac{\omega_a}{2} & \frac{\Omega}{2} \sqrt{n+1} \\[8pt]
\frac{\Omega}{2} \sqrt{n+1} & (n+1)\omega_c -\frac{\omega_a}{2}
\end{pmatrix}$$

For a given $n$, the energy eigenvalues of $H^{(n)}$ are
$$E_{\pm}(n) = \hbar \omega_c \left(n+\frac{1}{2}\right) \pm \frac{1}{2} \hbar\Omega_n(\delta),$$
where $\Omega_n(\delta) = \sqrt{\delta^2 +\Omega^2(n+1)}$ is the Rabi frequency for the specific detuning parameter. The eigenstates $|n,\pm\rangle$ associated with the energy eigenvalues are given by
$$|n,+\rangle= \cos \left(\frac{\alpha_n}{2}\right)|\psi_{1n}\rangle+\sin \left(\frac{\alpha_n}{2}\right)|\psi_{2n}\rangle$$
$$|n,-\rangle= \sin \left(\frac{\alpha_n}{2}\right)|\psi_{1n}\rangle-\cos \left(\frac{\alpha_n}{2}\right) |\psi_{2n}\rangle$$
where the angle $\alpha_n$ is defined through
$$\alpha_n := \tan^{-1}\left(\frac{\Omega \sqrt{n+1}}{\delta}\right).$$

=== Schrödinger picture dynamics ===
It is now possible to obtain the dynamics of a general state by expanding it into the basis of these eigenstates. We consider a superposition of number states as the initial state for the field, $|\psi_\text{field}(0)\rangle = \sum_n{C_n|n\rangle}$, and assume an atom in the excited state is injected into the field. The initial state of the system is
$$|\psi_\text{tot}(0)\rangle=\sum_n{C_n|n,e\rangle}= \sum_n C_n \left[ \cos \left(\frac{\alpha_n}{2}\right)|n,+\rangle+\sin \left(\frac{\alpha_n}{2}\right)|n,-\rangle\right].$$

Since the $|n,\pm\rangle$ are stationary states of the field-atom system, then the state vector for times $t > 0$ is just given by
$$|\psi_\text{tot}(t)\rangle = e^{-i\hat{H}_{\text{JC}}t/\hbar}|\psi_\text{tot}(0)\rangle = \sum_n C_n \left[ \cos \left(\frac{\alpha_n}{2}\right)|n,+\rangle e^{-iE_+(n)t/\hbar}+ \sin \left(\frac{\alpha_n}{2}\right)|n,-\rangle e^{-iE_-(n)t/\hbar}\right].$$

The Rabi oscillations can readily be seen in the sin and cos functions in the state vector. Different periods occur for different number states of photons. What is observed in experiment is the sum of many periodic functions that can be very widely oscillating and destructively sum to zero at some moment of time, but will be non-zero again at later moments. Finiteness of this moment results just from discreteness of the periodicity arguments. If the field amplitude were continuous, the revival would have never happened at finite time.

=== Heisenberg picture dynamics ===
It is possible in the Heisenberg notation to directly determine the unitary evolution operator from the Hamiltonian:
$$\begin{matrix}\begin{align}
\hat{U}(t) &= e^{-i\hat{H}_{\text{JC}}t/\hbar}\\
&=
\begin{pmatrix}
e^{- i \omega_c t \left(\hat{a}^{\dagger} \hat{a} + \frac{1}{2}\right)}\left( \cos t \sqrt{\hat{\varphi} + g^2} - i \delta/2 \frac{\sin t \sqrt{\hat{\varphi} +
g^2}}{\sqrt{\hat{\varphi} + g^2}}\right)
& - i g e^{- i \omega_c t \left(\hat{a}^{\dagger} \hat{a} + \frac{1}{2}\right)} \frac{\sin t \sqrt{\hat{\varphi} + g^2}}{\sqrt{\hat{\varphi} + g^2}} \,\hat{a} \\
-i g e^{- i \omega_c t \left(\hat{a}^{\dagger} \hat{a} - \frac{1}{2}\right)} \frac{\sin t \sqrt{\hat{\varphi}}} {\sqrt{\hat{\varphi}}} \hat{a}^{\dagger}
& e^{- i \omega_c t \left(\hat{a}^{\dagger} \hat{a} - \frac{1}{2} \right)} \left( \cos t \sqrt{\hat{\varphi}} + i \delta/2 \frac{\sin t \sqrt{\hat{\varphi}}}{\sqrt{\hat{\varphi} }}\right)
\end{pmatrix}
\end{align}\end{matrix}$$
where the operator $\hat{\varphi}$ is defined as
$$\hat{\varphi} = g^2 \hat{a}^{\dagger} \hat{a} + \delta^2/4$$
and $g$ is given by
$$g = \frac{\Omega}{\hbar}$$

The unitarity of $\hat{U}$ is guaranteed by the identities
$$\begin{align}
\frac{\sin t\,\sqrt{\hat{\varphi} + g^2}}{\sqrt{\hat{\varphi} + g^2}}\; \hat{a} &= \hat{a}\; \frac{\sin t\,\sqrt{\hat{\varphi}}}{\sqrt{\hat{\varphi}}} , \\
\cos t\, \sqrt{\hat{\varphi} + g^2}\; \hat{a} &= \hat{a}\; \cos t \sqrt{\hat{\varphi}},
\end{align}$$
and their Hermitian conjugates.

By the unitary evolution operator one can calculate the time evolution of the state of the system described by its density matrix $\hat{\rho}(t)$, and from there the expectation value of any observable, given the initial state:
$$\hat{\rho}(t) = \hat{U}^{\dagger}(t)\hat{\rho}(0)\hat{U}(t)$$
$$\langle\hat{\Theta}\rangle_{t}=\text{Tr}[\hat{\rho}(t)\hat{\Theta}]$$

The initial state of the system is denoted by $\hat{\rho}(0)$ and $\hat{\Theta}$ is an operator denoting the observable.

== Collapses and revivals of quantum oscillations ==
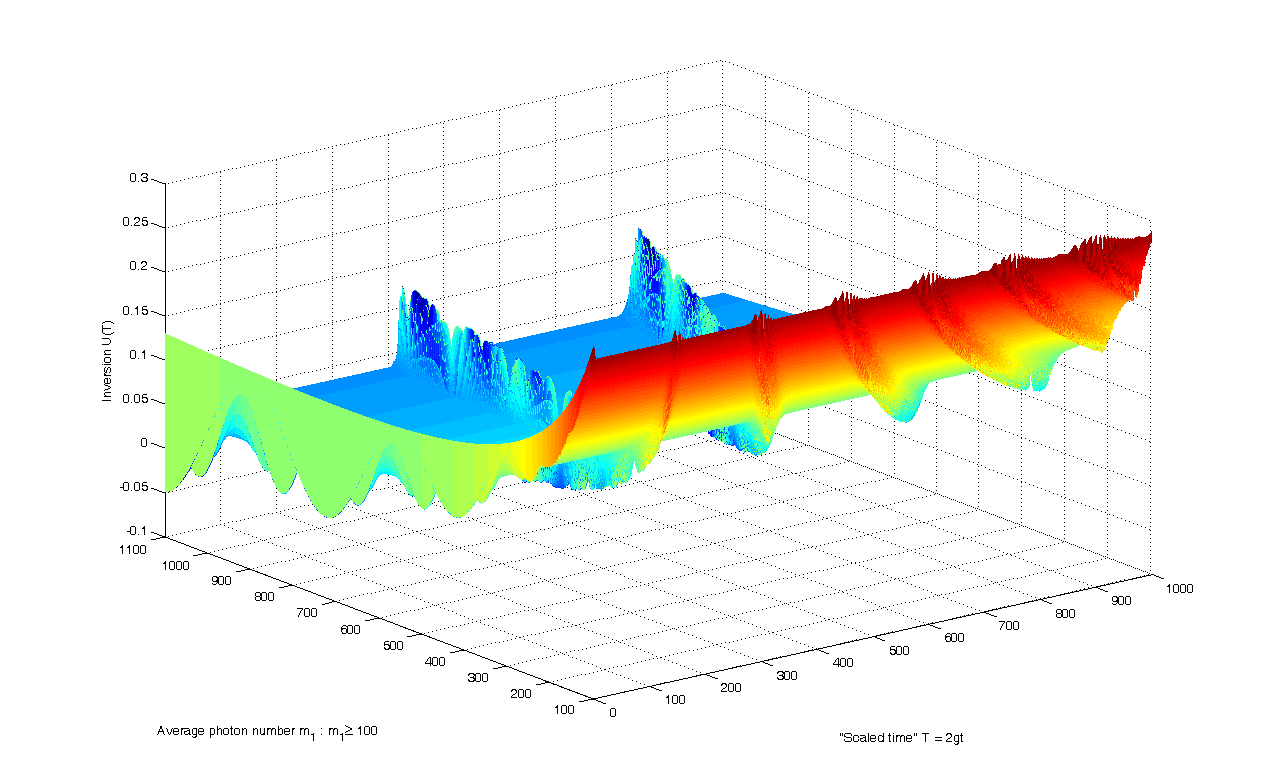

When the field is initially prepared in a coherent state, the Jaynes–Cummings model predicts collapse and revival of the atomic inversion. Initially, coherent Rabi oscillations decay due to interference among different photon-number components, but at later times the oscillations periodically revive. This nonclassical effect has no counterpart in semiclassical radiation theory and is regarded as one of the most distinctive predictions of the model.

This plot of quantum oscillations of atomic inversion—for quadratic scaled detuning parameter $a = (\delta/2g)^2 = 40$, where $\delta$ is the detuning parameter—was built on the basis of formulas obtained by A.A. Karatsuba and E.A. Karatsuba.

== See also ==
- Caldeira–Leggett model
- Jaynes–Cummings–Hubbard model
- Rabi problem
- Spontaneous emission
- Vacuum Rabi oscillation
