= Vacuum Rabi oscillation =

Damped oscillation in quantum optics

In cavity quantum electrodynamics, a vacuum Rabi oscillation is a damped oscillation of an initially excited atom coupled to an electromagnetic resonator or cavity in which the atom alternately emits photon(s) into a single-mode electromagnetic cavity in the ground state and reabsorbs them. The cavity being in the ground state or empty state makes the phenomenon be termed "vacuum" Rabi oscillation, which is a subset of general Rabi oscillations. The atom interacts with a single-mode field confined to a limited volume V in an optical cavity. Spontaneous emission is a consequence of coupling between the atom and the vacuum fluctuations of the cavity field.

== Mathematical treatment ==
A mathematical description of vacuum Rabi oscillation begins with the Jaynes–Cummings model, which describes the interaction between a single mode of a quantized field and a two level system inside an optical cavity. The Hamiltonian for this model in the rotating wave approximation is

$$\hat{H}_{\text{JC}} = \hbar \omega \hat{a}^{\dagger}\hat{a}
+\hbar \omega_0 \frac{\hat{\sigma}_z}{2}
+\hbar g \left(\hat{a}\hat{\sigma}_+
+\hat{a}^{\dagger}\hat{\sigma}_-\right)$$

where $\hat{\sigma_z}$ is the Pauli z spin operator for the two eigenstates $|e \rangle$ and $|g\rangle$ of the isolated two level system separated in energy by $\hbar \omega_0$; $\hat{\sigma}_+ = |e \rangle \langle g |$ and $\hat{\sigma}_- = |g \rangle \langle e |$ are the raising and lowering operators of the two level system; $\hat{a}^{\dagger}$ and $\hat{a}$ are the creation and annihilation operators for photons of energy $\hbar \omega$ in the cavity mode; and

$$g=\frac{\mathbf{d}\cdot\hat{\mathcal{E}}}{\hbar}\sqrt{\frac{\hbar \omega}{2 \epsilon_0 V}}$$

is the strength of the coupling between the dipole moment $\mathbf{d}$ of the two level system and the cavity mode with volume $V$ and electric field polarized along $\hat{\mathcal{E}}$. The energy eigenvalues and eigenstates for this model are

$$E_{\pm}(n) = \hbar\omega \left(n+\frac{1}{2}\right) \pm \frac{\hbar}{2} \sqrt{4g^2 (n+1) + \delta^2}=\hbar \omega_n^\pm$$

$$|n,+\rangle= \cos \left(\theta_n\right)|g,n+1\rangle+\sin \left(\theta_n\right)|e,n\rangle$$

$$|n,-\rangle= \sin \left(\theta_n\right)|g,n+1\rangle-\cos \left(\theta_n\right)|e,n\rangle$$

where $\delta = \omega_0 - \omega$ is the detuning, and the angle $\theta_n$ is defined as

$$\theta_n = \tan^{-1}\left(\frac{g \sqrt{n+1}}{\delta}\right).$$

Given the eigenstates of the system, the time evolution operator can be written down in the form

$$\begin{align}
e^{-i\hat{H}_{\text{JC}}t/\hbar} & = \sum_{|n,\pm \rangle} \sum_{|n',\pm \rangle} |n,\pm \rangle \langle n,\pm| e^{-i\hat{H}_{\text{JC}}t/\hbar} |n',\pm \rangle \langle n',\pm|\\
&= ~e^{i(\omega-\frac{\omega_0}{2})t} |g,0\rangle \langle g,0| \\
& ~~~+ \sum_{n=0}^\infty{e^{-i\omega_n^+ t} ( \cos{\theta_n}|g,n+1\rangle+\sin{\theta_n}|e,n\rangle)
( \cos{\theta_n}\langle g,n+1|+\sin{\theta_n}\langle e,n|)} \\
& ~~~+ \sum_{n=0}^\infty{e^{-i\omega_n^- t} (-\sin{\theta_n}|g,n+1\rangle+\cos{\theta_n}|e,n\rangle)
(-\sin{\theta_n}\langle g,n+1|+\cos{\theta_n}\langle e,n|)} \\
\end{align}.$$

If the system starts in the state $|g,n+1\rangle$, where the atom is in the ground state of the two level system and there are $n+1$ photons in the cavity mode, the application of the time evolution operator yields

$$\begin{align}
e^{-i\hat{H}_{\text{JC}}t/\hbar} |g,n+1\rangle
&= (e^{-i\omega_n^+ t}(\cos^2{(\theta_n)}|g,n+1\rangle+\sin{\theta_n}\cos{\theta_n}|e,n\rangle)
+ e^{-i\omega_n^- t} (-\sin^2{(\theta_n)}|g,n+1\rangle-\sin{\theta_n}\cos{\theta_n}|e,n\rangle)\\
&= (e^{-i\omega_n^+ t}+e^{-i\omega_n^- t}) \cos{(2 \theta_n)}|g,n+1\rangle
+ (e^{-i\omega_n^+ t}-e^{-i\omega_n^- t}) \sin{(2 \theta_n)}|e,n\rangle\\
&= e^{-i \omega_c(n+\frac{1}{2})}\Biggr[\cos{\biggr(\frac{t}{2}\sqrt{4g^2(n+1)+\delta^2} \biggr)} \biggr[\frac{\delta^2-4g^2(n+1)}{\delta^2+4g^2(n+1)}\biggr]|g,n+1\rangle\\
&\quad + \sin{\biggr(\frac{t}{2}\sqrt{4g^2(n+1)+\delta^2}\biggr)}\biggr[\frac{8 \delta^2 g^2(n+1)}{\delta^2+4g^2(n+1)}\biggr]|e,n\rangle\Biggr]
\end{align}.$$

The probability that the two level system is in the excited state $|e,n\rangle$ as a function of time $t$ is then

$$\begin{align}
P_e(t) & =|\langle e,n|e^{-i\hat{H}_{\text{JC}}t/\hbar} |g,n+1\rangle |^2\\
&= \sin^2{\biggr(\frac{t}{2}\sqrt{4g^2(n+1)+\delta^2}\biggr)}\biggr[\frac{8 \delta^2 g^2(n+1)}{\delta^2+4g^2(n+1)}\biggr]\\
&= \frac{4g^2(n+1)}{\Omega_n^2} \sin^2{\bigr(\frac{\Omega_n t}{2}\bigr)}
\end{align}$$

where $\Omega_n=\sqrt{4g^2(n+1)+\delta^2}$ is identified as the Rabi frequency. For the case that there is no electric field in the cavity, that is, the photon number $n$ is zero and the cavity is initially in the vacuum state, the Rabi frequency becomes $\Omega_0=\sqrt{4g^2+\delta^2}$. Then, the probability that the two level system goes from its ground state to its excited state as a function of time $t$ is

$$P_e(t) =\frac{4g^2}{\Omega_0^2} \sin^2{\bigr(\frac{\Omega_0 t}{2}\bigr).}$$

For a cavity that admits a single mode perfectly resonant with the energy difference between the two energy levels, the detuning $\delta$ vanishes, and $P_e(t)$ becomes a squared sinusoid with unit amplitude and period $\frac{2 \pi}{g}.$

== Generalization to N atoms ==
The situation in which $N$ two level systems are present in a single-mode cavity is described by the Tavis–Cummings model , which has Hamiltonian

$$\hat{H}_{\text{JC}} = \hbar \omega \hat{a}^{\dagger}\hat{a}
+\sum_{j=1}^N{\hbar \omega_0 \frac{\hat{\sigma}_j^z}{2}
+\hbar g_j \left(\hat{a}\hat{\sigma}_j^+
+\hat{a}^{\dagger}\hat{\sigma}_j^-\right)}.$$

Under the assumption that all two level systems have equal individual coupling strength $g$ to the field, the ensemble as a whole will have enhanced coupling strength $g_N=g\sqrt{N}$. As a result, the vacuum Rabi splitting is correspondingly enhanced by a factor of $\sqrt{N}$.

== See also ==
- Jaynes–Cummings model
- Quantum fluctuation
- Rabi cycle
- Rabi frequency
- Rabi problem
- Spontaneous emission
- Isidor Isaac Rabi
