= Rabi cycle =

Quantum mechanical phenomenon

Rabi oscillations, showing the probability of a two-level system initially in $|1\rangle$ to end up in $|2\rangle$ at different detunings Δ.

In physics, the Rabi cycle (or Rabi flop) is the cyclic behaviour of a two-level quantum system in the presence of an oscillatory driving field. A great variety of physical processes belonging to the areas of quantum computing, condensed matter, atomic and molecular physics, and nuclear and particle physics can be conveniently studied in terms of two-level quantum mechanical systems, and exhibit Rabi flopping when coupled to an optical driving field. The effect is important in quantum optics, magnetic resonance, and quantum computing, and is named after Isidor Isaac Rabi.

A two-level system is one that has a Hilbert space spanned by two possible orthogonal states. These states may have two possible energy levels. One level can be a ground state with lower energy, and the other can be an excited state with higher energy. If the energy levels are not degenerate (i.e. don't have equal energies), the system can absorb or emit a quantum of energy and transition from the ground state to the excited state or vice versa. When an atom (or some other two-level system) is illuminated by a coherent beam of photons, it will cyclically absorb photons and emit them by stimulated emission. One such cycle is called a Rabi cycle, and the reciprocal of its duration is the Rabi frequency of the system. The effect can be modeled using the Jaynes–Cummings model and the Bloch vector formalism.

More generally, the introduction of an oscillatory driving field to a two-level system can be viewed as a perturbation which couples the previously uncoupled states. The time evolution under this perturbed Hamiltonian therefore results in oscillations, called Rabi cycles, between the two unperturbed states. In the strong coupling limit, a complete oscillation between the unperturbed states is observed.

== Mathematical description of spin flipping ==
One example of Rabi flopping is the spin flipping within a quantum system containing a spin-1/2 particle and an oscillating magnetic field. We split the magnetic field into a constant 'environment' field, and the oscillating part, so that our field may be written as
$$\mathbf{B} = \mathbf{B}_{env} + \mathbf{B}_{osc} = B_0 \mathbf{k} + B_1 (\cos(\omega t)\mathbf{i} + \sin(\omega t)\mathbf{j}),$$
where $B_0$ and $B_1$ are the strengths of the environment and the oscillating fields respectively, and $\omega$ is the frequency at which the oscillating field oscillates. We can then write a Hamiltonian describing this field, yielding
$$H = -\vec{\mu} \cdot \mathbf{B} = \omega_0 S_z + \omega_1(\cos(\omega t)S_x + \sin(\omega t)S_y)$$
where the magnetic moment is
$$\hat{\mathbf{\mu}} = - \gamma \mathbf{S} = - \gamma (\hat{S_x}\mathbf{{i}} + \hat{S_y}\mathbf{{j}} + \hat{S_z}\mathbf{{k}}),$$
$\gamma$ is the gyromagnetic ratio of the particle, $\omega_0 = \gamma B_0$, $\omega_1 = \gamma B_1$, and $\hat{S_x}, \hat{S_y}, \hat{S_z}$ are the spin operators. The frequency $\omega_1$is known as the Rabi frequency. We can substitute in the matrix forms of the spin operators in the $z$ basis to find the matrix representing the Hamiltonian:
$$\begin{align}
H &= \omega_0 \frac{\hbar}{2} \begin{bmatrix} 1 & 0 \\ 0 & -1 \end{bmatrix}
+ \omega_1 \left(\cos(\omega t)\frac{\hbar}{2}
\begin{bmatrix} 0 & 1 \\ 1 & 0 \end{bmatrix} + \sin(\omega t)\frac{\hbar}{2}
\begin{bmatrix} 0 & -i \\ i & 0 \end{bmatrix}\right) \\
&= \frac{\hbar}{2}\begin{bmatrix} \omega_0 & \omega_1 e^{-i\omega t} \\ \omega_1 e^{i\omega t} & -\omega_0\end{bmatrix}
\end{align}$$
where we have used $\cos(\omega t) + i\sin(\omega t) = e^{i\omega t}$. This Hamiltonian is a function of time, meaning we cannot use the standard prescription of Schrödinger time evolution in quantum mechanics. For time independent Hamiltonians, the time evolution of a state may be expressed using the time evolution operator $U(t) = e^{-iHt/\hbar}$, but this formula cannot directly be used for time dependent Hamiltonians.

The main strategy in solving this problem is to transform the Hamiltonian so that the time dependence is gone, solve the problem in this transformed frame, and then transform the results back to normal. This can be done by shifting the reference frame that we work in to match the rotating magnetic field. If we rotate along with the magnetic field, then from our point of view, the magnetic field is not rotating and appears constant. Therefore, in the rotating reference frame, both the magnetic field and the Hamiltonian are constant with respect to time.

We denote our spin-1/2 particle state to be $|\psi(t)\rangle = c_+(t)|+\rangle + c_-(t)|-\rangle$ in the stationary reference frame, where $|+\rangle$ and $|-\rangle$ are spin up and spin down states in the $z$ direction respectively, and the state is normalized: $|c_+(t)|^2 + |c_-(t)|^2 = 1$. We can transform this state to the rotating reference frame by using a rotation operator
$$R_z(\theta) = \begin{bmatrix} e^{-i\theta/2} & 0 \\ 0 & e^{i\theta/2} \end{bmatrix}$$
which rotates the state counterclockwise around the positive z-axis in state space, which may be visualized as a Bloch sphere. At a time $t$ and a frequency $\omega$, the magnetic field will have precessed around by an angle $\omega t$. To transform $|\psi(t)\rangle$ into the rotating reference frame, we seek to represent the spin up and spin down states from the stationary frame in the rotating frame. Critically, note that the stationary x and y-axes rotate clockwise from the point of view of the rotating reference frame. Thus, because the $R_z(\theta)$ operator rotates counterclockwise, we must negate the angle to create a clockwise rotation that will represent the spin up and down states in the stationary frame as viewed by the rotating frame. The state becomes
$$|\tilde{\psi}(t)\rangle = R_z(-\omega t)|\psi(t)\rangle = c_+(t)e^{i\omega t/2}|+\rangle + c_-(t)e^{-i\omega t/2}|-\rangle$$
We may rewrite the amplitudes so that
$$|\tilde{\psi}(t)\rangle = \alpha_+(t)|+\rangle + \alpha_-(t)|-\rangle$$
The time dependent Schrödinger equation in the stationary reference frame is
$$i\hbar \frac{d}{dt}|\psi(t)\rangle = H(t)|\psi(t)\rangle$$
Expanding this using the matrix forms of the Hamiltonian and the state yields
$$i\hbar\begin{bmatrix}\frac{dc_+}{dt} \\ \frac{dc_-}{dt}\end{bmatrix} = \frac{\hbar}{2} \begin{bmatrix} \omega_0 & \omega_1 e^{-i\omega t} \\ \omega_1 e^{i\omega t} & -\omega_0 \end{bmatrix} \begin{bmatrix} c_+(t) \\ c_-(t) \end{bmatrix}$$
Applying the matrix and separating the components of the vector allows us to write two coupled differential equations as follows
$$\begin{align}
& i\hbar \frac{dc_+}{dt} = \frac{\hbar\omega_0}{2} c_+(t) + \frac{\hbar\omega_1}{2} e^{-i\omega t} c_-(t) \\
& i\hbar \frac{dc_-}{dt} = \frac{\hbar\omega_1}{2} e^{i\omega t} c_+(t) - \frac{\hbar\omega_0}{2} c_-(t)
\end{align}$$
To transform this into the rotating reference frame, we may use the fact that $c_+(t) = \alpha_+(t) e^{-i \omega t/2}$ and $c_-(t) = \alpha_-(t) e^{i \omega t/2}$ to write the following:
$$\begin{align}
& i\hbar \frac{d\alpha_+}{dt} = - \frac{\hbar\Delta\omega}{2} \alpha_+(t) + \frac{\hbar\omega_1}{2} \alpha_-(t) \\
& i\hbar \frac{d\alpha_-}{dt} = \frac{\hbar\omega_1}{2} \alpha_+(t) + \frac{\hbar\Delta\omega}{2} \alpha_-(t)
\end{align}$$
where $\Delta\omega = \omega - \omega_0$. Now define
$$\tilde{H} = \frac{\hbar}{2} \begin{bmatrix} -\Delta\omega & \omega_1 \\ \omega_1 & \Delta\omega \end{bmatrix}$$
We now write these two new coupled differential equations back into the form of the Schrödinger equation:
$$i\hbar \frac{d}{dt}|\tilde{\psi}(t)\rangle = \tilde{H}|\tilde{\psi}(t)\rangle$$
In some sense, this is a transformed Schrödinger equation in the rotating reference frame. Crucially, the Hamiltonian does not vary with respect to time, meaning in this reference frame, we can use the familiar solution to Schrödinger time evolution:
$$|\tilde{\psi}(t)\rangle = \tilde{U}(t)|\tilde{\psi}(0)\rangle = e^{-i \tilde{H}t/\hbar} |\tilde{\psi}(0)\rangle$$
This transformed problem is equivalent to that of Larmor precession of a spin state, which is the precession of a spin state around a constant stationary magnetic field, so we have solved the essence of Rabi flopping. The probability that a particle starting in the spin up state flips to the spin down state can be stated as
$$P_{+\to -} = \frac{\omega_1^2}{\Omega^2} \sin^2\left(\frac{\Omega}{2}t\right)$$
where $\Omega = \sqrt{\Delta \omega^2 + \omega^2_1}$ is the generalized Rabi Frequency. Something important to notice is that $P_{+ \to -}$ will not reach 1 unless $\Delta\omega = 0$. In other words, the frequency of the rotating magnetic field $\omega$ must match the environmental field's Larmor frequency $\omega_0$ in order for the spin to fully flip; they must achieve resonance. When resonance (i.e. $\omega = \omega_0$) is achieved, $\Omega = \omega_1$.

To transform the solved state back to the stationary reference frame, we reuse the rotation operator with the opposite angle$|\psi(t)\rangle = R_z(\omega t)|\tilde{\psi}(t)\rangle$, thus yielding a full solution to the problem.

== Applications ==
The Rabi effect is important in quantum optics, magnetic resonance and quantum computing.

=== Quantum optics ===
Rabi flopping may be used to describe a two-level atom with an excited state and a ground state in an electromagnetic field with frequency tuned to the excitation energy. Using the spin-flipping formula but applying it to this system yields

$$|c_b(t)|^2 \propto \sin^2(\omega t/2),$$

where $\omega$ is the Rabi frequency.

=== Quantum computing ===
Any two-state quantum system can be used to model a qubit. Rabi flopping provides a physical way to allow for spin flips in a qubit system. At resonance, the transition probability is given by
$$P_{0\to1}(t)=\sin^2\left(\frac{\omega_1 t}{2}\right).$$
To go from state $|0\rang$ to state $|1\rang$ it is sufficient to adjust the time $t$ during which the rotating field acts such that $\omega_1 t / 2 = \pi /2$ or $t=\pi / \omega_1$. This is called a $\pi$ pulse. If a time intermediate between 0 and $\pi / \omega_1$ is chosen, we obtain a superposition of $|0\rang$ and $|1\rang$. In particular for $t=\frac{\pi}{2\omega_1}$, we have a $\frac{\pi}{2}$ pulse, which acts as:
$$|0\rang \to \frac{|0\rang+i|1\rang}{\sqrt{2}}$$
The equations are essentially identical in the case of a two level atom in the field of a laser when the generally well satisfied rotating wave approximation is made, where $\hbar\omega_0$ is the energy difference between the two atomic levels, $\omega$ is the frequency of laser wave and Rabi frequency $\omega_1$ is proportional to the product of the transition electric dipole moment of atom $\vec{d}$ and electric field $\vec{E}$ of the laser wave that is $\omega_1 \propto \hbar \ \vec{d} \cdot \vec{E}$. On a quantum computer, these oscillations are obtained by exposing qubits to periodic electric or magnetic fields during suitably adjusted time intervals.

== See also ==
- Atomic coherence
- Bloch sphere
- Laser pumping
- Optical pumping
- Rabi problem
- Vacuum Rabi oscillation
- Neutral particle oscillation
