= Jaynes–Cummings–Hubbard model =

Model in quantum optics

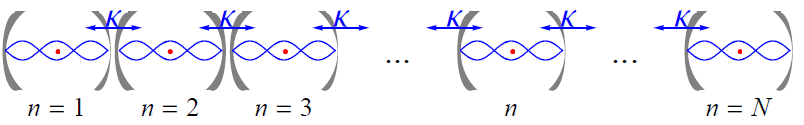
Tunnelling of photons between coupled cavities. The $\kappa$ is the tunnelling rate of photons.

Illustration of the Jaynes–Cummings model. In the circle, photon emission and absorption are shown.

The Jaynes–Cummings–Hubbard (JCH) model is a many-body quantum system modeling the quantum phase transition of light. As the name suggests, the Jaynes–Cummings–Hubbard model is a variant on the Jaynes–Cummings model; a one-dimensional JCH model consists of a chain of N coupled single-mode cavities, each with a two-level atom. Unlike in the competing Bose–Hubbard model, Jaynes–Cummings–Hubbard dynamics depend on photonic and atomic degrees of freedom and hence require strong-coupling theory for treatment. One method for realizing an experimental model of the system uses circularly-linked superconducting qubits.

== History ==
The combination of Hubbard-type models with Jaynes–Cummings (atom-photon) interactions near the photon blockade regime originally appeared in three, roughly simultaneous papers in 2006.

All three papers explored systems of interacting atom-cavity systems, and shared much of the essential underlying physics. Nevertheless, the term Jaynes–Cummings–Hubbard was not coined until 2008.

== Properties ==
Using mean-field theory to predict the phase diagram of the JCH model, the JCH model should exhibit Mott insulator and superfluid phases.

=== Hamiltonian ===
The Hamiltonian of the JCH model is ($\hbar=1$):

$$H = \sum_{n=1}^{N}\omega_c a_{n}^{\dagger}a_{n}
+\sum_{n=1}^{N}\omega_a \sigma_n^+\sigma_n^-
+ \kappa  \sum_{n=1}^{N}
\left(a_{n+1}^{\dagger}a_{n}+a_{n}^{\dagger}a_{n+1}\right)
+ \eta \sum_{n=1}^{N}  \left(a_{n}\sigma_{n}^{+}
+ a_{n}^{\dagger}\sigma_{n}^{-}\right)$$

where $\sigma_{n}^{\pm}$ are Pauli operators for the two-level atom at the n-th cavity. The $\kappa$ is the tunneling rate between neighboring cavities, and $\eta$ is the vacuum Rabi frequency which characterizes to the photon-atom interaction strength. The cavity frequency is $\omega_c$ and atomic transition frequency is $\omega_a$. The cavities are treated as periodic, so that the cavity labelled by n = N+1 corresponds to the cavity n = 1. Note that the model exhibits quantum tunneling; this process is similar to the Josephson effect.

Defining the photonic and atomic excitation number operators as $\hat{N}_c \equiv \sum_{n=1}^{N}a_n^{\dagger}a_n$ and $\hat{N}_a \equiv \sum_{n=1}^{N} \sigma_{n}^{+}\sigma_{n}^{-}$, the total number of excitations is a conserved quantity, i.e., $\lbrack H,\hat{N}_c+\hat{N}_a\rbrack=0$.

=== Two-polariton bound states ===
The JCH Hamiltonian supports two-polariton bound states when the photon-atom interaction is sufficiently strong. In particular, the two polaritons associated with the bound states exhibit a strong correlation such that they stay close to each other in position space. This process is similar to the formation of a bound pair of repulsive bosonic atoms in an optical lattice.
