= Cavity quantum electrodynamics =

Quantum physics of light and matter in a cavity

Cavity Quantum Electrodynamics (cavity QED) is the study of the interaction between light confined in a reflective cavity and atoms or other particles, under conditions where the quantum nature of photons is significant. It could in principle be used to construct a quantum computer.

The case of a single 2-level atom in the cavity is mathematically described by the Jaynes–Cummings model, and undergoes vacuum Rabi oscillations $|e\rangle|n-1\rangle\leftrightarrow|g\rangle|n\rangle$, that is between an excited atom and $n-1$ photons, and a ground state atom and $n$ photons.

If the cavity is in resonance with the atomic transition, a half-cycle of oscillation starting with no photons coherently swaps the atom qubit's state onto the cavity field's, $(\alpha|g\rangle+\beta|e\rangle)|0\rangle\leftrightarrow|g\rangle(\alpha|0\rangle+\beta|1\rangle)$, and can be repeated to swap it back again; this could be used as a single photon source (starting with an excited atom), or as an interface between an atom or trapped ion quantum computer and optical quantum communication.

Other interaction durations create entanglement between the atom and cavity field; for example, a quarter-cycle on resonance starting from $|e\rangle|0\rangle$ gives the maximally entangled state (a Bell state) $(|e\rangle|0\rangle+|g\rangle|1\rangle)/\sqrt{2}$. This can in principle be used as a quantum computer, mathematically equivalent to a trapped ion quantum computer with cavity photons replacing phonons.

== Nobel Prize in Physics ==
The 2012 Nobel Prize for Physics was awarded to Serge Haroche and David Wineland for their work on controlling quantum systems.

Haroche shares half of the prize for developing a new field called cavity quantum electrodynamics (CQED) – whereby the properties of an atom are controlled by placing it in an optical or microwave cavity. Haroche focused on microwave experiments and turned the technique on its head – using CQED to control the properties of individual photons.

In a series of ground-breaking experiments, Haroche used CQED to realize Schrödinger's famous cat experiment in which a system is in a superposition of two very different quantum states until a measurement is made on the system. Such states are extremely fragile, and the techniques developed to create and measure CQED states are now being applied to the development of quantum computers.

== See also ==
- Circuit quantum electrodynamics
- Superconducting radio frequency
- Dicke model
