= Rotating-wave approximation =

Model used in atom optics and magnetic resonance

The rotating-wave approximation is an approximation used in atom optics and magnetic resonance. In this approximation, terms in a Hamiltonian that oscillate rapidly are neglected. This is a valid approximation when the applied electromagnetic radiation is near resonance with an atomic transition, and the intensity is low. Explicitly, terms in the Hamiltonians that oscillate with frequencies $\omega_L + \omega_0$ are neglected, while terms that oscillate with frequencies $\omega_L - \omega_0$ are kept, where $\omega_L$ is the light frequency, and $\omega_0$ is a transition frequency.

The name of the approximation stems from the form of the Hamiltonian in the interaction picture, as shown below. By switching to this picture the evolution of an atom due to the corresponding atomic Hamiltonian is absorbed into the system ket, leaving only the evolution due to the interaction of the atom with the light field to consider. It is in this picture that the rapidly oscillating terms mentioned previously can be neglected. Since in some sense the interaction picture can be thought of as rotating with the system ket only that part of the electromagnetic wave that approximately co-rotates is kept; the counter-rotating component is discarded.

The rotating-wave approximation is closely related to, but different from, the secular approximation.

== Mathematical formulation ==
For simplicity consider a two-level atomic system with ground and excited states $|\text{g}\rangle$ and $|\text{e}\rangle$, respectively (using the Dirac bracket notation). Let the energy difference between the states be $\hbar\omega_0$ so that $\omega_0$ is the transition frequency of the system. Then the unperturbed Hamiltonian of the atom can be written as

$$H_0 = \frac{\hbar\omega_0}{2}|\text{e}\rangle\langle\text{e}|-\frac{\hbar\omega_0}{2}|\text{g}\rangle\langle\text{g}|$$.

Suppose the atom experiences an external classical electric field of frequency $\omega_L$, given by $\vec{E}(t) = \vec{E}_0 e^{-i\omega_Lt} +\vec{E}_0^* e^{i\omega_Lt}$; e.g., a plane wave propagating in space. Then under the dipole approximation the interaction Hamiltonian between the atom and the electric field can be expressed as

$$H_1 = -\vec{d} \cdot \vec{E}$$,

where $\vec{d}$ is the dipole moment operator of the atom. The total Hamiltonian for the atom-light system is therefore $H = H_0 + H_1.$ The atom does not have a dipole moment when it is in an energy eigenstate, so $\left\langle\text{e}\left|\vec{d}\right|\text{e}\right\rangle = \left\langle\text{g}\left|\vec{d}\right|\text{g}\right\rangle = 0.$ This means that defining $\vec{d}_\text{eg} \mathrel{:=} \left\langle\text{e}\left|\vec{d}\right|\text{g}\right\rangle$ allows the dipole operator to be written as

$$\vec{d} = \vec{d}_\text{eg}|\text{e}\rangle\langle\text{g}| + \vec{d}_\text{eg}^*|\text{g}\rangle\langle\text{e}|$$

(with $^*$ denoting the complex conjugate). The interaction Hamiltonian can then be shown to be

$$H_1 =
-\hbar\left(\Omega e^{-i\omega_Lt} + \tilde{\Omega}e^{i\omega_Lt}\right)|\text{e}\rangle\langle\text{g}|
-\hbar\left(\tilde{\Omega}^* e^{-i\omega_Lt} + \Omega^*e^{i\omega_Lt}\right)|\text{g}\rangle\langle\text{e}|$$

where $\Omega = \hbar^{-1}\vec{d}_\text{eg} \cdot \vec{E}_0$ is the Rabi frequency and $\tilde{\Omega} \mathrel{:=} \hbar^{-1}\vec{d}_\text{eg} \cdot \vec{E}_0^*$ is the counter-rotating frequency. To see why the $\tilde{\Omega}$ terms are called counter-rotating consider a unitary transformation to the interaction or Dirac picture where the transformed Hamiltonian $H_{1,I}$ is given by

$$H_{1,I} =
-\hbar\left(\Omega e^{-i\Delta \omega t} + \tilde{\Omega}e^{i(\omega_L + \omega_0)t}\right)|\text{e}\rangle\langle\text{g}|
-\hbar\left(\tilde{\Omega}^* e^{-i(\omega_L + \omega_0)t} + \Omega^* e^{i\Delta \omega t}\right)|\text{g}\rangle\langle\text{e}|,$$

where $\Delta \omega \mathrel{:=} \omega_L - \omega_0$ is the detuning between the light field and the atom.

=== Making the approximation ===
Two-level-system on resonance with a driving field with (blue) and without (green) applying the rotating-wave approximation.

This is the point at which the rotating wave approximation is made. The dipole approximation has been assumed, and for this to remain valid the electric field must be near resonance with the atomic transition. This means that $\Delta \omega \ll \omega_L + \omega_0$ and the complex exponentials multiplying $\tilde{\Omega}$ and $\tilde{\Omega}^*$ can be considered to be rapidly oscillating. Hence on any appreciable time scale, the oscillations will quickly average to 0. The rotating wave approximation is thus the claim that these terms may be neglected and thus the Hamiltonian can be written in the interaction picture as

$$H_{1,I}^{\text{RWA}} =
-\hbar\Omega e^{-i\Delta \omega t}|\text{e}\rangle\langle\text{g}|
-\hbar\Omega^* e^{i\Delta \omega t}|\text{g}\rangle\langle\text{e}|.$$

Finally, transforming back into the Schrödinger picture, the Hamiltonian is given by

$$H^\text{RWA} =
\frac{\hbar\omega_0}{2}|\text{e}\rangle\langle\text{e}|
- \frac{\hbar\omega_0}{2}|\text{g}\rangle\langle\text{g}|
- \hbar\Omega e^{-i\omega_Lt}|\text{e}\rangle\langle\text{g}|
- \hbar\Omega^* e^{i\omega_Lt}|\text{g}\rangle\langle\text{e}|.$$

Another criterion for rotating wave approximation is the weak coupling condition, that is, the Rabi frequency should be much less than the transition frequency.

At this point the rotating wave approximation is complete. A common first step beyond this is to remove the remaining time dependence in the Hamiltonian via another unitary transformation.

== Derivation ==
Given the above definitions the interaction Hamiltonian is

$$\begin{align}
H_1  = -\vec{d}\cdot\vec{E}
&= -\left(\vec{d}_\text{eg}|\text{e}\rangle\langle\text{g}| + \vec{d}_\text{eg}^*|\text{g}\rangle\langle\text{e}|\right)
\cdot \left(\vec{E}_0 e^{-i\omega_Lt} + \vec{E}_0^* e^{i\omega_Lt}\right) \\
&= -\left(\vec{d}_\text{eg} \cdot \vec{E}_0 e^{-i\omega_Lt}
+\vec{d}_\text{eg} \cdot \vec{E}_0^* e^{i\omega_Lt}\right)|\text{e}\rangle\langle\text{g}|
\\
&-\left(\vec{d}_\text{eg}^* \cdot \vec{E}_0 e^{-i\omega_Lt}
+\vec{d}_\text{eg}^* \cdot \vec{E}_0^* e^{i\omega_Lt}\right)|\text{g}\rangle\langle\text{e}| \\
&= -\hbar\left(\Omega e^{-i\omega_Lt} + \tilde{\Omega} e^{i\omega_Lt}\right)|\text{e}\rangle\langle\text{g}|
-\hbar\left(\tilde{\Omega}^* e^{-i\omega_Lt} + \Omega^* e^{i\omega_Lt}\right)|\text{g}\rangle\langle\text{e}|,
\end{align}$$

as stated. The next step is to find the Hamiltonian in the interaction picture, $H_{1,I}$. The required unitary transformation is:

$$\begin{align}
U & = e^{iH_0t/\hbar} \\
& =  e^{i \omega_0 t/2 (|\text{e}\rangle \langle\text{e}| - |\text{g}\rangle \langle\text{g}|)} \\
& = \cos\left(\frac{\omega_0 t}{2}\right)
\left(|\text{e}\rangle \langle\text{e}| + |\text{g}\rangle \langle\text{g}|\right) + i \sin\left(\frac{\omega_0 t}{2}\right) \left(|\text{e}\rangle \langle\text{e}| - |\text{g}\rangle \langle\text{g}|\right) \\
& = e^{-i\omega_0 t/2}|\text{g}\rangle \langle\text{g}| + e^{i \omega_0 t/2} |\text{e}\rangle \langle\text{e}| \\
& = e^{-i\omega_0 t/2}\left(|\text{g}\rangle \langle\text{g}| + e^{i \omega_0 t} |\text{e}\rangle \langle\text{e}|\right)
\end{align}$$

,where the 3rd step can be proved by using a Taylor series expansion, and using the orthogonality of the states $|\text{g}\rangle$ and $|\text{e}\rangle$. Note that a multiplication by an overall phase of $e^{i \omega_0 t/2}$ on a unitary operator does not affect the underlying physics, so in the further usages of $U$ we will neglect it. Applying $U$ gives:

$$\begin{align}
H_{1,I} &\equiv U H_1 U^\dagger \\
&= -\hbar\left(\Omega e^{-i\omega_Lt} + \tilde{\Omega}e^{i\omega_Lt}\right)e^{i\omega_0t}|\text{e}\rangle\langle\text{g}|
-\hbar\left(\tilde{\Omega}^* e^{-i\omega_Lt} + \Omega^*e^{i\omega_Lt}\right)|\text{g}\rangle\langle\text{e}|e^{-i\omega_0t} \\
&= -\hbar\left(\Omega e^{-i\Delta \omega t} + \tilde{\Omega}e^{i(\omega_L + \omega_0)t}\right)|\text{e}\rangle\langle\text{g}|
-\hbar\left(\tilde{\Omega}^*e^{-i(\omega_L + \omega_0)t} + \Omega^* e^{i\Delta \omega t}\right)|\text{g}\rangle\langle\text{e}|\ .
\end{align}$$

Now we apply the RWA by eliminating the counter-rotating terms as explained in the previous section:

$$H_{1,I}^{\text{RWA}} = -\hbar\Omega e^{-i\Delta\omega t}|\text{e}\rangle\langle\text{g}| + -\hbar\Omega^* e^{i \Delta\omega t}|\text{g}\rangle\langle\text{e}|$$

Finally, we transform the approximate Hamiltonian $H_{1,I}^{\text{RWA}}$ back to the Schrödinger picture:

$$\begin{align}
H_1^\text{RWA} &= U^\dagger H_{1,I}^{\text{RWA}} U \\
&= -\hbar\Omega e^{-i\Delta \omega t}e^{-i\omega_0 t}|\text{e}\rangle\langle\text{g}|
-\hbar\Omega^* e^{i\Delta \omega t}|\text{g}\rangle\langle\text{e}|e^{i\omega_0t} \\
&= -\hbar\Omega e^{-i\omega_Lt}|\text{e}\rangle\langle\text{g}|
-\hbar\Omega^* e^{i\omega_Lt}|\text{g}\rangle\langle\text{e}|.
\end{align}$$

The atomic Hamiltonian was unaffected by the approximation, so the total Hamiltonian in the Schrödinger picture under the rotating wave approximation is

$$H^\text{RWA} = H_0 + H_1^\text{RWA} =
\frac{\hbar\omega_0}{2}|\text{e}\rangle\langle\text{e}| -
\frac{\hbar\omega_0}{2}|\text{g}\rangle\langle\text{g}| -
\hbar\Omega e^{-i\omega_Lt}|\text{e}\rangle\langle\text{g}| -
\hbar\Omega^*e^{i\omega_Lt}|\text{g}\rangle\langle\text{e}|.$$
