= Index of physics articles (Q) =

The index of physics articles is split into multiple pages due to its size.

To navigate by individual letter use the table of contents below.

== Q ==
- Q-Spoil
- Q-ball
- Q-switching
- QCD matter
- QCD string
- QCD sum rules
- QCD vacuum
- QED: The Strange Theory of Light and Matter
- QED vacuum
- QMAP
- QMC@Home
- QMR effect
- QSO J0005-0006
- QSO J0303-0019
- QSO J0842+1835
- Q band
- Q factor
- Q star
- Q value (nuclear science)
- Qian Sanqiang
- Qiwam al-Din Muhammad al-Hasani
- Quadratic configuration interaction
- Quadrupole
- Quadrupole ion trap
- Quadrupole magnet
- Quadrupole mass analyzer
- Quaestiones quaedam philosophicae
- Quake-Catcher Network
- QuakeFinder
- QuakeSat
- Quality Assurance Review Center
- Quan-Sheng Shu
- Quantization (physics)
- Quantization error
- Quantization of the electromagnetic field
- Quantum
- Quantum-confined Stark effect
- Quantum-mechanical explanation of intermolecular interactions
- Quantum (book)
- Quantum 1/f noise
- Quantum Aspects of Life
- Quantum Bayesianism
- Quantum Darwinism
- Quantum Electronics (journal)
- Quantum Hall effect
- Quantum KZ equations
- Quantum LC circuit
- Quantum Monte Carlo
- Quantum Philosophy
- Quantum Tunnelling Composite
- Quantum Zeno effect
- Quantum acoustics
- Quantum algorithm
- Quantum beats
- Quantum biology
- Quantum bus
- Quantum capacitance
- Quantum cascade laser
- Quantum channel
- Quantum chaos
- Quantum chromodynamics
- Quantum cloning
- Quantum coherence
- Quantum cohomology
- Quantum computer
- Quantum concentration
- Quantum correlation
- Quantum cosmology
- Quantum critical point
- Quantum decoherence
- Quantum defect
- Quantum degeneracy
- Quantum dimer models
- Quantum dissipation
- Quantum dot
- Quantum dot cellular automaton
- Quantum dot laser
- Quantum efficiency
- Quantum efficiency of a solar cell
- Quantum electrodynamics
- Quantum electromagnetic resonator
- Quantum electronics
- Quantum electronics (journal)
- Quantum energy teleportation
- Quantum entanglement
- Quantum eraser experiment
- Quantum field theory
- Quantum field theory in curved spacetime
- Quantum flavordynamics
- Quantum fluctuation
- Quantum fluid
- Quantum flux parametron
- Quantum foam
- Quantum gauge theory
- Quantum geometry
- Quantum gravity
- Quantum gravity epoch
- Quantum gyroscope
- Quantum harmonic oscillator
- Quantum heterostructure
- Quantum history
- Quantum hydrodynamics
- Quantum hypothesis
- Quantum indeterminacy
- Quantum information
- Quantum inverse scattering method
- Quantum key distribution
- Quantum key distribution network
- Quantum limit
- Quantum logic
- Quantum machine
- Quantum magnetism
- Quantum mechanical Bell test prediction
- Quantum mechanics
- Quantum mechanics of time travel
- Quantum metamaterials
- Quantum metrology
- Quantum mirage
- Quantum mutual information
- Quantum noise
- Quantum non-equilibrium
- Quantum nondemolition measurement
- Quantum nonlocality
- Quantum number
- Quantum operation
- Quantum optics
- Quantum oscillations
- Quantum paraelectricity
- Quantum phase transition
- Quantum phases
- Quantum point contact
- Quantum probability
- Quantum processing unit
- Quantum pseudo-telepathy
- Quantum Realm
- Quantum register
- Quantum relative entropy
- Quantum rotor model
- Quantum size effects
- Quantum solid
- Quantum solvent
- Quantum spin model
- Quantum state
- Quantum statistical mechanics
- Quantum suicide and immortality
- Quantum superposition
- Quantum technology
- Quantum teleportation
- Quantum thermodynamics
- Quantum tomography
- Quantum triviality
- Quantum tunnelling
- Quantum tunnelling composite
- Quantum turbulence
- Quantum vortex
- Quantum walk
- Quantum well
- Quantum well infrared photodetector
- Quantum well laser
- Quantum wire
- Quantum yield
- Quark
- Quark-nova
- Quark (disambiguation)
- Quark epoch
- Quark model
- Quark number
- Quark star
- Quarkonium
- Quark–gluon plasma
- Quark–lepton complementarity
- Quarterly Journal of the RAS
- Quarterly Journal of the Royal Astronomical Society
- Quartic interaction
- Quartz crystal microbalance
- Quasar
- Quasi-invariant measure
- Quasi-periodic oscillation
- Quasi-phase-matching
- Quasi-satellite
- Quasi-solid
- Quasi-star
- Quasi-steady state cosmology
- Quasi Fermi level
- Quasiatom
- Quasicrystal
- Quasinormal mode
- Quasiparticle
- Quasiperiodic motion
- Quasiprobability distribution
- Quasistability
- Quasistatic approximation
- Quasistatic equilibrium
- Quasistatic loading
- Quasistatic process
- Qubit
- Qubit field theory
- Quenched approximation
- Quenching (fluorescence)
- Quintessence (physics)
- Quirino Majorana
- Quiver diagram
