= Superradiant laser =

A superradiant laser is a laser that does not rely on a large population of photons within the laser cavity to maintain coherence.

Rather than relying on photons to store phase coherence, it relies on collective effects in an atomic medium to store coherence. Such a laser uses repumped Dicke superradiance (or superfluorescence) to sustain emission of light that can have a substantially narrower linewidth than a conventional laser.

== See also ==
- Dicke model
- Superradiant phase transition
