= Rechargeable battery =

Electric battery which can be recharged

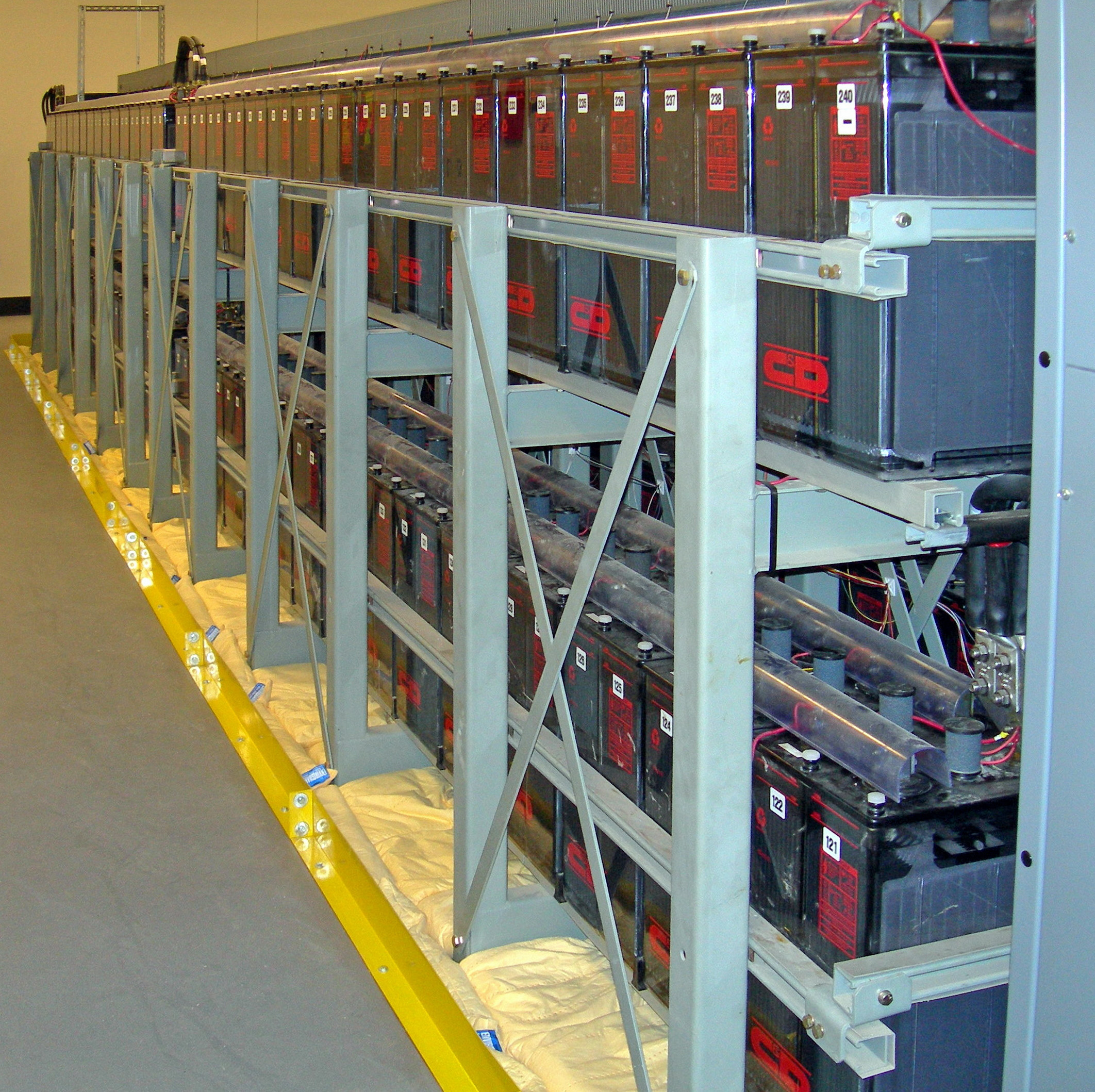
A battery bank used for an uninterruptible power supply in a data center

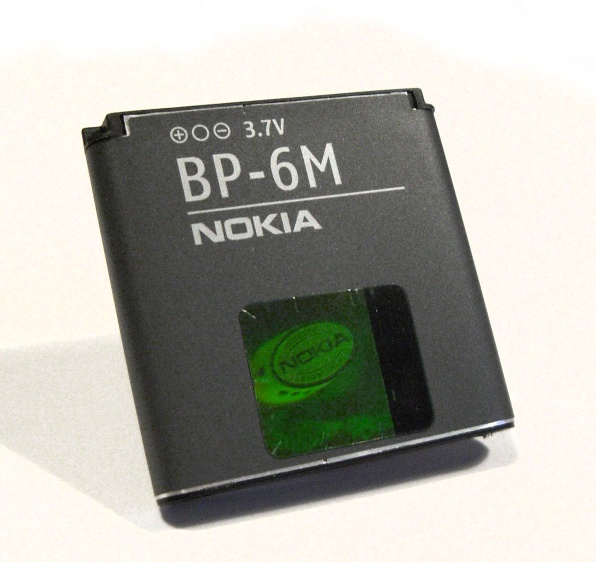
The Nokia BP-6M, a rechargeable lithium polymer battery for mobile devices

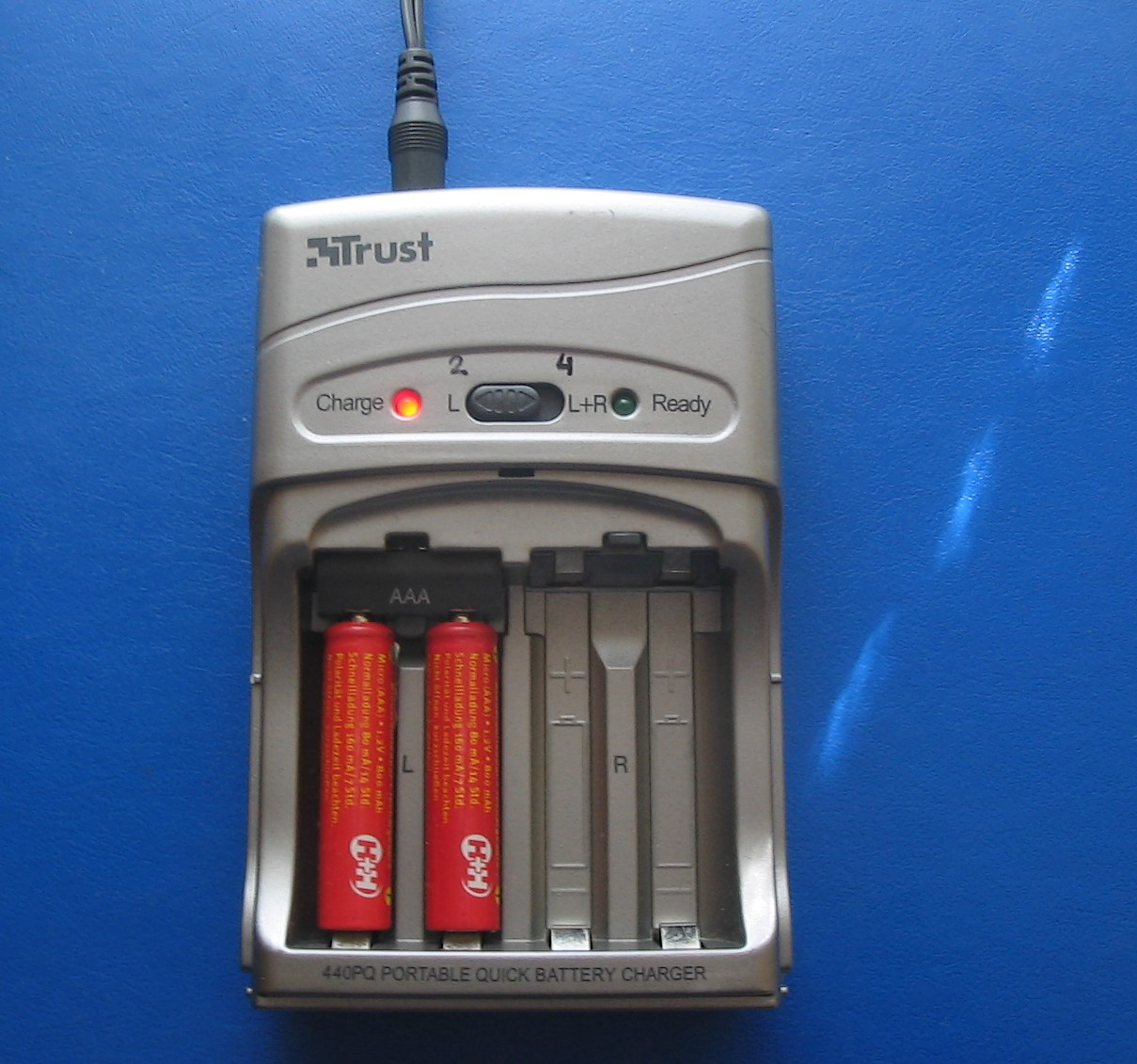
A common consumer battery charger for rechargeable AA and AAA batteries

A rechargeable battery, storage battery, or secondary cell (formally a type of energy accumulator) is a type of electric battery which can be charged, discharged into a load, and recharged many times, as opposed to a disposable or primary battery, which is supplied fully charged and discarded after use. It is composed of one or more electrochemical cells. The term "accumulator" is used as it accumulates and stores energy through a reversible electrochemical reaction. Rechargeable batteries are produced in many different shapes and sizes, ranging from button cells to megawatt systems connected to stabilize an electrical distribution network. Several different combinations of electrode materials and electrolytes are used, including lead–acid, zinc–air, nickel–cadmium (NiCd), nickel–metal hydride (NiMH), lithium-ion (Li-ion), lithium iron phosphate (LiFePO_{4}), and lithium-ion polymer (Li-ion polymer).

Rechargeable batteries typically initially cost more than disposable batteries but have a much lower total cost of ownership and environmental impact, as they can be recharged inexpensively many times before they need replacing. Some rechargeable battery types are available in the same sizes and voltages as disposable types, and can be used interchangeably with them. Billions of dollars in research are being invested around the world for improving batteries as industry focuses on building better batteries.

== Applications ==
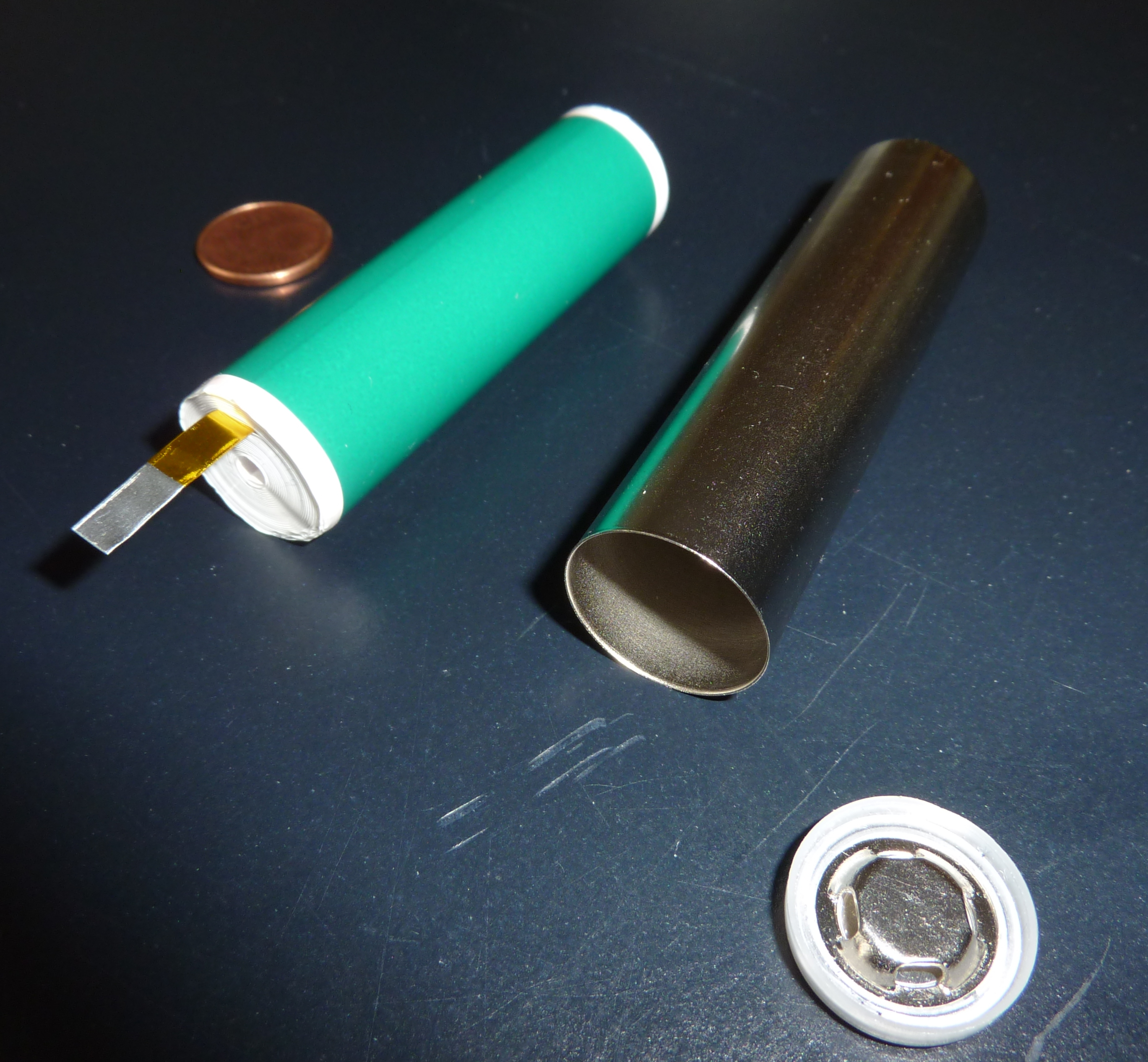
Cylindrical cell (18650) prior to assembly. Several thousand of them (lithium ion) form the Tesla Model S battery (see Gigafactory).

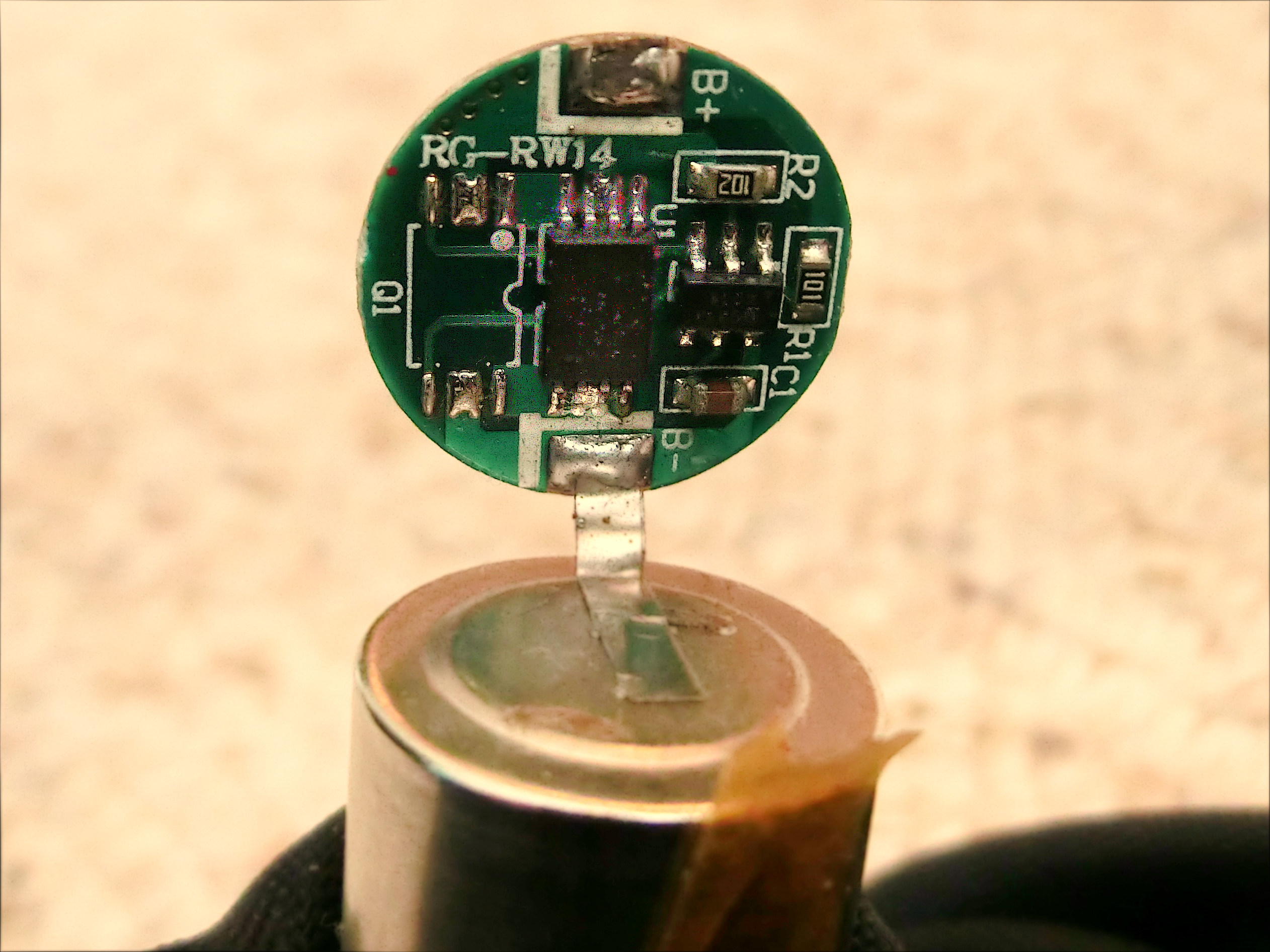
Lithium ion battery monitoring electronics (over- and discharge protection)

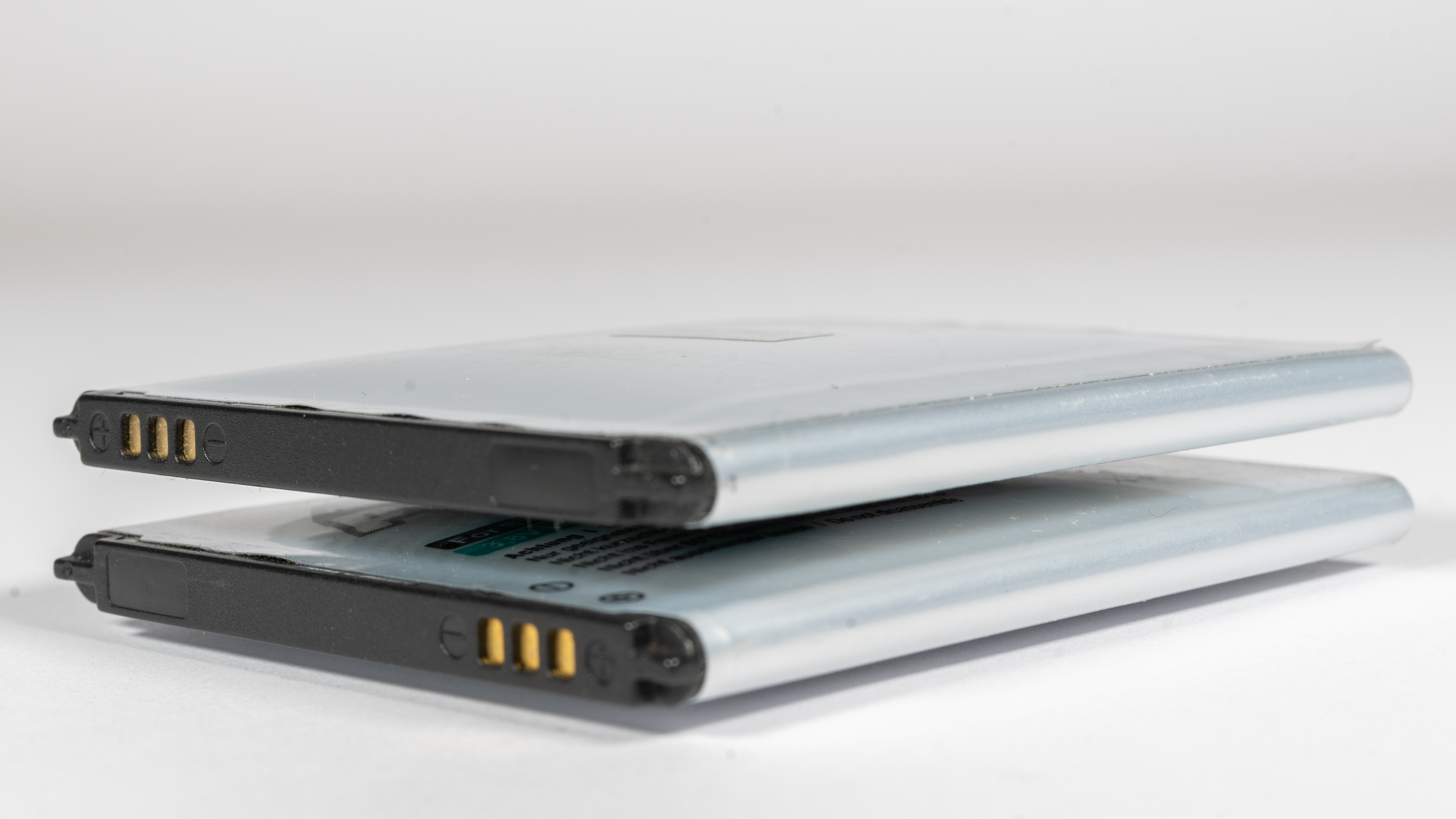
Bloated lithium ion mobile phone batteries, possibly damaged by faulty monitoring electronics

Devices which use rechargeable batteries include automobile starters, portable consumer devices, light vehicles (such as motorized wheelchairs, golf carts, electric bicycles, and electric forklifts), road vehicles (cars, vans, trucks, motorbikes), trains, small airplanes, tools, uninterruptible power supplies, and battery storage power stations. Emerging applications in hybrid internal combustion-battery and electric vehicles drive the technology to reduce cost, weight, and size, and increase lifetime.

Older rechargeable batteries self-discharge relatively rapidly and require charging before first use; some newer low self-discharge NiMH batteries hold their charge for many months, and are typically sold factory-charged to about 70% of their rated capacity.

Battery storage power stations use rechargeable batteries for load-leveling (storing electric energy at times of low demand for use during peak periods) and for renewable energy uses (such as storing power generated from photovoltaic arrays during the day to be used at night). Load-leveling reduces the maximum power which a plant must be able to generate, reducing capital cost and the need for peaking power plants.

According to a report from Research and Markets, the analysts forecast the global rechargeable battery market to grow at a CAGR of 8.32% during the period 2018–2022.

Small rechargeable batteries can power portable electronic devices, power tools, appliances, and so on. Heavy-duty batteries power electric vehicles, ranging from scooters to locomotives and ships. They are used in distributed electricity generation and in stand-alone power systems.

== Charging and discharging ==
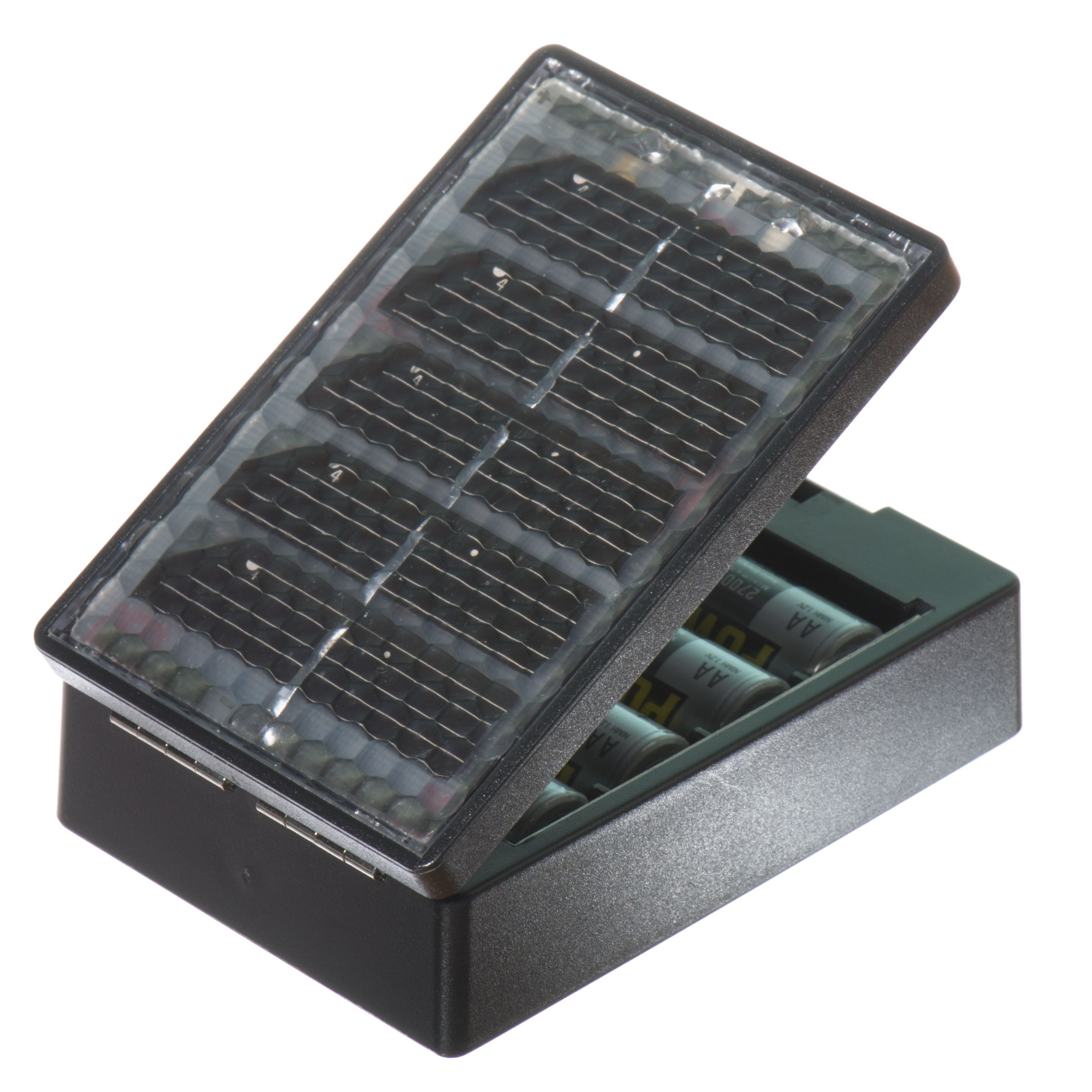
A solar-powered charger for rechargeable AA batteries

During charging, the positive active material is oxidized, releasing electrons, and the negative material is reduced, absorbing electrons. These electrons constitute the current flow in the external circuit. The electrolyte may serve as a simple buffer for internal ion flow between the electrodes, as in lithium-ion and nickel-cadmium cells, or it may be an active participant in the electrochemical reaction, as in lead–acid cells.

The energy used to charge rechargeable batteries usually comes from a battery charger using AC mains electricity, although some are equipped to use a vehicle's 12-volt DC power outlet. The voltage of the source must be higher than that of the battery to force current to flow into it, but not too much higher or the battery may be damaged.

Chargers take from a few minutes to several hours to charge a battery. Slow "dumb" chargers without voltage or temperature-sensing capabilities will charge at a low rate, typically taking 14 hours or more to reach a full charge. Rapid chargers can typically charge cells in two to five hours, depending on the model, with the fastest taking as little as fifteen minutes. Fast chargers must have multiple ways of detecting when a cell reaches full charge (change in terminal voltage, temperature, etc.) to stop charging before harmful overcharging or overheating occurs. The fastest chargers often incorporate cooling fans to keep the cells from overheating. Battery packs intended for rapid charging may include a temperature sensor that the charger uses to protect the pack; the sensor will have one or more additional electrical contacts.

Different battery chemistries require different charging schemes. For example, some battery types can be safely recharged from a constant voltage source. Other types need to be charged with a regulated current source that tapers as the battery reaches fully charged voltage. Charging a battery incorrectly can damage a battery; in extreme cases, batteries can overheat, catch fire, or explosively vent their contents.

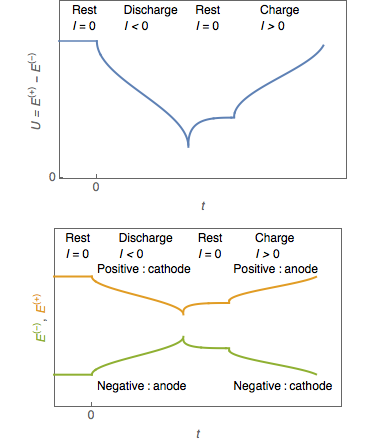
Positive and negative electrode vs. anode and cathode for a secondary battery

=== Rate of discharge ===
Battery charging and discharging rates are often discussed by referencing a "C" rate of current. The C rate is that which would theoretically fully charge or discharge the battery in one hour. For example, trickle charging might be performed at C/20 (or a "20-hour" rate), while typical charging and discharging may occur at C/2 (two hours for full capacity). The available capacity of electrochemical cells varies depending on the discharge rate. Some energy is lost in the internal resistance of cell components (plates, electrolyte, interconnections), and the rate of discharge is limited by the speed at which chemicals in the cell can move about. For lead-acid cells, the relationship between time and discharge rate is described by Peukert's law; a lead-acid cell that can no longer sustain a usable terminal voltage at a high current may still have usable capacity, if discharged at a much lower rate. Data sheets for rechargeable cells often list the discharge capacity on 8-hour or 20-hour or other stated time; cells for uninterruptible power supply systems may be rated at 15-minute discharge.

The terminal voltage of the battery is not constant during charging and discharging. Some types have relatively constant voltage during discharge over much of their capacity. Non-rechargeable alkaline and zinc–carbon cells output 1.5 V when new, but this voltage drops with use. Most NiMH AA and AAA cells are rated at 1.2 V, but have a flatter discharge curve than alkalines and can usually be used in equipment designed to use alkaline batteries.

Battery manufacturers' technical notes often refer to voltage per cell (VPC) for the individual cells that make up the battery. For example, to charge a 12 V lead-acid battery (containing 6 cells of 2 V each) at 2.3 VPC requires a voltage of 13.8 V across the battery's terminals.

=== Damage from cell reversal ===
Subjecting a discharged cell to a current in the direction which tends to discharge it further to the point the positive and negative terminals switch polarity causes a condition called cell reversal. Generally, pushing current through a discharged cell in this way causes undesirable and irreversible chemical reactions to occur, resulting in permanent damage to the cell. Cell reversal can occur under a number of circumstances, the two most common being:

- When a battery or cell is connected to a charging circuit the wrong way around.
- When a battery made of several cells connected in series is deeply discharged.

In the latter case, the problem occurs due to the different cells in a battery having slightly different capacities. When one cell reaches discharge level ahead of the rest, the remaining cells will force the current through the discharged cell.

Many battery-operated devices have a low-voltage cutoff that prevents deep discharges from occurring that might cause cell reversal. A smart battery has voltage monitoring circuitry built inside.

Cell reversal can occur to a weakly charged cell even before it is fully discharged. If the battery drain current is high enough, the cell's internal resistance can create a resistive voltage drop that is greater than the cell's forward emf. This results in the reversal of the cell's polarity while the current is flowing. The higher the required discharge rate of a battery, the better matched the cells should be, both in the type of cell and state of charge, in order to reduce the chances of cell reversal.

In some situations, such as when correcting NiCd batteries that have been previously overcharged, it may be desirable to fully discharge a battery. To avoid damage from the cell reversal effect, it is necessary to access each cell separately: each cell is individually discharged by connecting a load clip across the terminals of each cell, thereby avoiding cell reversal.

=== Damage during storage in fully discharged state ===
If a multi-cell battery is fully discharged, it will often be damaged due to the cell reversal effect mentioned above. It is possible however to fully discharge a battery without causing cell reversal—either by discharging each cell separately, or by allowing each cell's internal leakage to dissipate its charge over time.

Even if a cell is brought to a fully discharged state without reversal, however, damage may occur over time simply due to remaining in the discharged state. An example of this is the sulfation that occurs in lead-acid batteries that are left sitting on a shelf for long periods. For this reason it is often recommended to charge a battery that is intended to remain in storage, and to maintain its charge level by periodically recharging it. Since damage may also occur if the battery is overcharged, the optimal level of charge during storage is typically around 30% to 70%.

=== Depth of discharge ===
Depth of discharge (DOD) is normally stated as a percentage of the nominal ampere-hour capacity; 0% DOD means no discharge. As the usable capacity of a battery system depends on the rate of discharge and the allowable voltage at the end of discharge, the depth of discharge must be qualified to show the way it is to be measured. Due to variations during manufacture and aging, the DOD for complete discharge can change over time or number of charge cycles. Generally a rechargeable battery system will tolerate more charge/discharge cycles if the DOD is lower on each cycle. Lithium batteries can discharge to about 80 to 90% of their nominal capacity. Lead-acid batteries can discharge to about 50–60%. While flow batteries can discharge 100%.

=== Lifespan and cycle stability ===
If batteries are used repeatedly even without mistreatment, they lose capacity as the number of charge cycles increases, until they are eventually considered to have reached the end of their useful life. Different battery systems have differing mechanisms for wearing out. For example, in lead-acid batteries, not all the active material is restored to the plates on each charge/discharge cycle; eventually enough material is lost that the battery capacity is reduced. In lithium-ion types, especially on deep discharge, some reactive lithium metal can be formed on charging, which is no longer available to participate in the next discharge cycle. Sealed batteries may lose moisture from their liquid electrolyte, especially if overcharged or operated at high temperature. This reduces the cycling life.

=== Recharging time ===
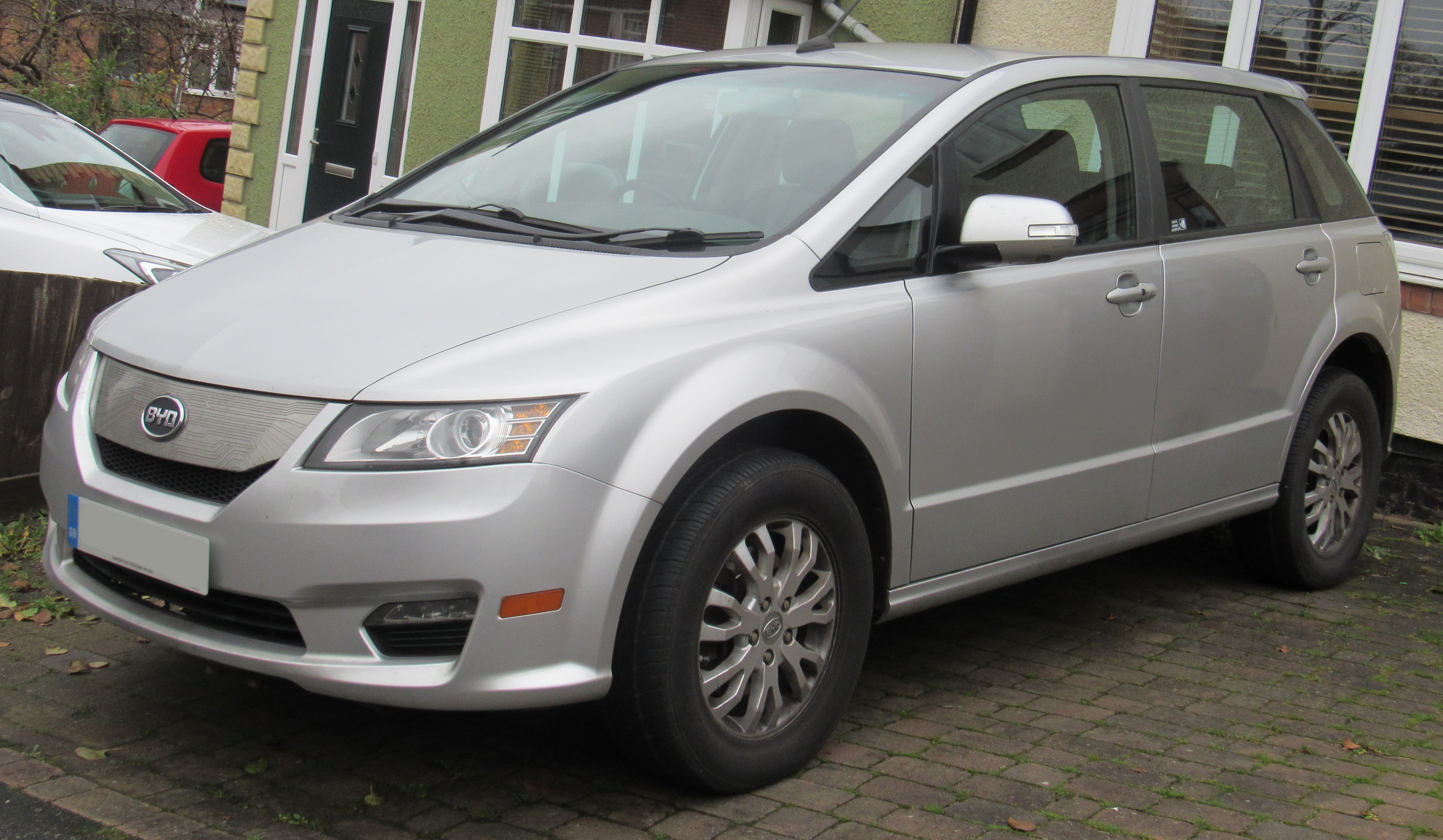
BYD e6 taxi, recharging in 15 minutes to 80 percent

Recharging time is an important parameter to the user of a product powered by rechargeable batteries. Even if the charging power supply provides enough power to operate the device as well as recharge the battery, the device is attached to an external power supply during the charging time. For electric vehicles used industrially, charging during off-shifts may be acceptable. For highway electric vehicles, rapid charging is necessary for charging in a reasonable time.

A rechargeable battery cannot be recharged at an arbitrarily high rate. The internal resistance of the battery will produce heat, and excessive temperature rise will damage or destroy a battery. For some types, the maximum charging rate will be limited by the speed at which active material can diffuse through a liquid electrolyte. High charging rates may produce excess gas in a battery, or may result in damaging side reactions that permanently lower the battery capacity. Very roughly, and with many exceptions and caveats, restoring a battery's full capacity in one hour or less is considered fast charging. A battery charger system will include more complex control-circuit- and charging strategies for fast charging, than for a charger designed for slower recharging.

== Active components ==
The active components in a secondary cell are the chemicals that make up the positive and negative active materials, and the electrolyte. The positive and negative electrodes are made up of different materials, with the positive exhibiting a reduction potential and the negative having an oxidation potential. The sum of the potentials from these half-reactions is the standard cell potential or voltage.

In primary cells the positive and negative electrodes are known as the cathode and anode, respectively. Although this convention is sometimes carried through to rechargeable systems—especially with lithium-ion cells, because of their origins in primary lithium cells—this practice can lead to confusion. In rechargeable cells the positive electrode is the cathode on discharge and the anode on charge, and vice versa for the negative electrode.

== Types ==
Ragone plot of common types

=== Commercial types ===
The lead–acid battery, invented in 1859 by French physicist Gaston Planté, is the oldest type of rechargeable battery. Despite having a very low energy-to-weight ratio and a low energy-to-volume ratio, its ability to supply high surge currents means that the cells have a relatively large power-to-weight ratio. These features, along with the low cost, makes it attractive for use in motor vehicles to provide the high current required by automobile starter motors.

The nickel–cadmium battery (NiCd) was invented by Waldemar Jungner of Sweden in 1899. It uses nickel oxide hydroxide and metallic cadmium as electrodes. Cadmium is a toxic element, and was banned for most uses by the European Union in 2004. Nickel–cadmium batteries have been almost completely superseded by nickel–metal hydride (NiMH) batteries.

The nickel–iron battery (NiFe) was also developed by Waldemar Jungner in 1899; and commercialized by Thomas Edison in 1901 in the United States for electric vehicles and railway signalling. It is composed of only non-toxic elements, unlike many kinds of batteries that contain toxic mercury, cadmium, or lead.

The nickel–metal hydride battery (NiMH) became available in 1989. These are now a common consumer and industrial type. The battery has a hydrogen-absorbing alloy for the negative electrode instead of cadmium.

The lithium-ion battery was introduced in the market in 1991, is the choice in most consumer electronics, having the best energy density and a very slow loss of charge when not in use. It does have drawbacks too, particularly the risk of unexpected ignition from the heat generated by the battery. Such incidents are rare and according to experts, they can be minimized "via appropriate design, installation, procedures and layers of safeguards" so the risk is acceptable.

Lithium-ion polymer batteries (LiPo) are light in weight, offer slightly higher energy density than Li-ion at slightly higher cost, and can be made in any shape. They are available but have not displaced Li-ion in the market. A primary use is for LiPo batteries is in powering remote-controlled cars, boats and airplanes. LiPo packs are readily available on the consumer market, in various configurations, up to 44.4 V, for powering certain R/C vehicles and helicopters or drones. Some test reports warn of the risk of fire when the batteries are not used in accordance with the instructions. Independent reviews of the technology discuss the risk of fire and explosion from lithium-ion batteries under certain conditions because they use liquid electrolytes.

=== Other experimental types ===
Type	Voltage^{a}	Energy density^{b}			Power^{c}	E/$^{e}	Self-disch.^{f}	Charge Efficiency	Cycles^{g}	Life^{h}
Type	(V)	(MJ/kg)	(Wh/kg)	(Wh/L)	(W/kg)	(Wh/$)	(%/month)	(%)	(#)	(years)
Lithium–sulfur	2.0	0.94–1.44	400–500	350					~1400	
Magnesium–Sulfur	1.7									
Sodium-ion	3.6	0.27–0.72	75–200	30		3.3			5000+	Testing
Thin-film lithium	?	1.1	300	959	6000	?^{p}			40000	
Zinc–bromine	1.8	0.27–0.31	75–85							
Zinc–cerium	2.5									Under testing
Vanadium redox	1.15–1.55	0.09–0.13	25–35				20%		20,000	25 years
Sodium–sulfur		0.54	150					89–92%	2500–4500	
Molten-salt	2.58	0.25–1.04	70–290	160	150–220	4.54			3000+	≤ 20
Silver–zinc	1.86	0.47	130	240						
Nickel–zinc	1.65		70–90						8000	
Quantum battery (oxide semiconductor)	1.5–3			500	8000 (W/L)				100,000	

‡ citations are needed for these parameters

Notes

- ^{a} Nominal cell voltage in V.
- ^{b} Energy density = energy/weight or energy/size, given in three different units
- ^{c} Specific power = power/weight in W/kg
- ^{e} Energy/consumer price in W·h/US$ (approximately)
- ^{f} Self-discharge rate in %/month
- ^{g} Cycle durability in number of cycles
- ^{h} Time durability in years
- ^{i} VRLA or recombinant includes gel batteries and absorbed glass mats
- ^{p} Pilot production

Several types of lithium–sulfur battery have been developed, and numerous research groups and organizations have demonstrated that batteries based on lithium sulfur can achieve superior energy density to other lithium technologies. Whereas lithium-ion batteries offer energy density in the range of 150–260 Wh/kg, batteries based on lithium-sulfur are expected to achieve 450–500 Wh/kg, and can eliminate cobalt, nickel and manganese from the production process. Furthermore, while initially lithium-sulfur batteries suffered from stability problems, recent research has made advances in developing lithium-sulfur batteries that cycle as long as (or longer than) batteries based on conventional lithium-ion technologies.

The thin-film battery (TFB) is a refinement of lithium ion technology by Excellatron. The developers claim a large increase in recharge cycles to around 40,000 and higher charge and discharge rates, at least 5 C charge rate. Sustained 60 C discharge and 1000 C peak discharge rate and a significant increase in specific energy, and energy density.

lithium iron phosphate batteries are used in some applications.

UltraBattery, a hybrid lead–acid battery and ultracapacitor invented by Australia's national science organisation CSIRO, exhibits tens of thousands of partial state of charge cycles and has outperformed traditional lead-acid, lithium, and NiMH-based cells when compared in testing in this mode against variability management power profiles. UltraBattery has kW and MW-scale installations in place in Australia, Japan, and the U.S. It has also been subjected to extensive testing in hybrid electric vehicles and has been shown to last more than 100,000 vehicle miles in on-road commercial testing in a courier vehicle. The technology is claimed to have a lifetime of 7 to 10 times that of conventional lead-acid batteries in high rate partial state-of-charge use, with safety and environmental benefits claimed over competitors like lithium-ion. Its manufacturer suggests an almost 100% recycling rate is already in place for the product.

The potassium-ion battery delivers around a million cycles, due to the extraordinary electrochemical stability of potassium insertion/extraction materials such as Prussian blue.

The sodium-ion battery is meant for stationary storage and competes with lead–acid batteries. It aims at a low total cost of ownership per kWh of storage. This is achieved by a long and stable lifetime. The effective number of cycles is above 5000 and the battery is not damaged by deep discharge. The energy density is rather low, somewhat lower than lead–acid.

== Alternatives ==
A rechargeable battery is only one of several types of rechargeable energy storage systems. Several alternatives to rechargeable batteries exist or are under development. For uses such as portable radios, rechargeable batteries may be replaced by clockwork mechanisms which are wound up by hand, driving dynamos, although this system may be used to charge a battery rather than to operate the radio directly. Flashlights may be driven by a dynamo directly. For transportation, uninterruptible power supply systems and laboratories, flywheel energy storage systems store energy in a spinning rotor for conversion to electric power when needed; such systems may be used to provide large pulses of power that would otherwise be objectionable on a common electrical grid.

Ultracapacitors – capacitors of extremely high value – are also used; an electric screwdriver which charges in 90 seconds and will drive about half as many screws as a device using a rechargeable battery was introduced in 2007, and similar flashlights have been produced. In keeping with the concept of ultracapacitors, betavoltaic batteries may be utilized as a method of providing a trickle-charge to a secondary battery, greatly extending the life and energy capacity of the battery system being employed; this type of arrangement is often referred to as a "hybrid betavoltaic power source" by those in the industry.

Ultracapacitors are being developed for transportation, using a large capacitor to store energy instead of the rechargeable battery banks used in hybrid vehicles. One drawback of capacitors compared to batteries is that the terminal voltage drops rapidly; a capacitor that has 25% of its initial energy left in it will have one-half of its initial voltage. By contrast, battery systems tend to have a terminal voltage that does not decline rapidly until nearly exhausted. This terminal voltage drop complicates the design of power electronics for use with ultracapacitors. However, there are potential benefits in cycle efficiency, lifetime, and weight compared with rechargeable systems. China started using ultracapacitors on two commercial bus routes in 2006; one of them is route 11 in Shanghai.

Flow batteries, used for specialized applications, are recharged by replacing the electrolyte liquid. A flow battery can be considered to be a type of rechargeable fuel cell.

== See also ==
- History of the battery
- Comparison of commercial battery types
- Energy storage
- List of battery types
- Battery management system
