= Superradiance =

Various physical phenomena

In physics, superradiance, superradiant scattering or superradiation, is the radiation enhancement effects in several contexts including quantum mechanics, astrophysics and relativity.

== Quantum optics ==
For want of a better term, a gas which is radiating strongly because of coherence will be called "super-radiant".

— Robert H. Dicke, 1954

In quantum optics, superradiance is a form of spontaneous emission that occurs when a group of $N$ emitters, such as excited atoms, interact with a common light field. If the wavelength of the light is much greater than the separation of the emitters, then the emitters interact with the light in a collective and coherent fashion. This causes the group to emit light with an intensity proportional to $N^2$ and at a rate $N$ faster than independent emitters. This is a surprising result, drastically different from the expected exponential decay (with intensity proportional to $N$) of a group of independent atoms.

Superradiance has since been demonstrated in a wide variety of physical and chemical systems, such as quantum dot arrays and J-aggregates. This effect has been used to produce a superradiant laser.

== Superabsorption ==
Superabsorption is an optical phenomenon in which a system of atoms or molecules absorbs energy at a significantly faster rate as the size of the system grows, analogous to the way superradiance scales with size. Originally proposed as an effect that nanotechnology could exploit to create photon detectors or light power transmission, superabsorption has been realized experimentally as time reversal of superradiance. Superabsorption in an organic microcavity has been demonstrated using Lemogeb-F orange dye molecules, showing superextensive energy absorption and charging rates with possible applications to a quantum battery.

== Rotational superradiance ==
Rotational superradiance is associated with the acceleration or motion of a nearby body (which supplies the energy and momentum for the effect). It is also sometimes described as the consequence of an "effective" field differential around the body (e.g. the effect of tidal forces). This allows a body with a concentration of angular or linear momentum to move towards a lower energy state, even when there is no obvious classical mechanism for this to happen. In this sense, the effect has some similarities with quantum tunnelling (e.g. the tendency of waves and particles to "find a way" to exploit the existence of an energy potential, despite the absence of an obvious classical mechanism for this to happen).

- In classical physics, the motion or rotation of a body in a particulate medium will normally be expected to result in momentum and energy being transferred to the surrounding particles, and there is then an increased statistical likelihood of particles being discovered following trajectories that imply removal of momentum from the body.
- In quantum mechanics, this principle is extended to the case of bodies moving, accelerating or rotating in a vacuum – in the quantum case, quantum fluctuations with appropriate vectors are said to be stretched and distorted and provided with energy and momentum by the nearby body's motion, with this selective amplification generating real physical radiation around the body.

Where a classical description of a rotating isolated weightless sphere in a vacuum will tend to say that the sphere will continue to rotate indefinitely, due to the lack of frictional effects or any other form of obvious coupling with its smooth empty environment, under quantum mechanics the surrounding region of vacuum is not entirely smooth, and the sphere's field can couple with quantum fluctuations and accelerate them to produce real radiation. Hypothetical virtual wavefronts with appropriate paths around the body are stimulated and amplified into real physical wavefronts by the coupling process. Descriptions sometimes refer to these fluctuations "tickling" the field to produce the effect.

=== In black holes ===
In theoretical studies of black holes, the effect is also sometimes described as the consequence of the gravitational tidal forces around a strongly gravitating body pulling apart virtual particle pairs that would otherwise quickly mutually annihilate, to produce a population of real particles in the region outside the horizon.

The black hole bomb is an exponentially growing instability in the interaction between a massive bosonic field and a rotating black hole.

== Astrophysics and relativity ==
In astrophysics, a potential example of superradiance is Zeldovich radiation. It was Yakov Zeldovich who first described this effect in 1971; Igor Novikov at the University of Moscow further developed the theory. Zeldovich picked the case under quantum electrodynamics (QED) where the region around the equator of a spinning metal sphere is expected to throw off electromagnetic radiation tangentially, and suggested that the case of a spinning gravitational mass, such as a Kerr black hole ought to produce similar coupling effects, and ought to radiate in an analogous way.

This was followed by arguments from Stephen Hawking and others that an accelerated observer near a black hole (e.g. an observer carefully lowered towards the horizon at the end of a rope) ought to see the region inhabited by "real" radiation, whereas for a distant observer this radiation would be said to be "virtual". If the accelerated observer near the event horizon traps a nearby particle and throws it out to the distant observer for capture and study, then for the distant observer, the appearance of the particle can be explained by saying that the physical acceleration of the particle has turned it from a virtual particle into a "real" particle (see Hawking radiation).

Similar arguments apply for the cases of observers in accelerated frames (Unruh radiation). Cherenkov radiation, electromagnetic radiation emitted by charged particles travelling through a particulate medium at more than the nominal speed of light in that medium, has also been described as "inertial motion superradiance".

Additional examples of superradiance in astrophysical environments include the study of radiation flares in maser-hosting regions and fast radio bursts. Evidence of superradiance in these settings suggests the existence of intense emissions from entangled quantum mechanical states, involving a very large number of molecules, ubiquitously present across the universe and spanning large distances (e.g. from a few kilometres in the interstellar medium to possibly over several billion kilometres).

== Instruments ==
Instruments that use superradiant emission.

- Free-electron laser (FEL)
- Nitrogen lasers using transverse excitation at atmospheric pressure (TEA)
- Far-infrared (FIR) laser
- Undulator allows to obtain the superradiant emission.

== See also ==
- Dicke model
- Dicke state
- Superradiant phase transition
- Superradiance in semiconductor optics
- Unruh effect
