= QSO J0005−0006 =

Quasar in the constellation Pisces

Observation data (Epoch J2000.0)
- Constellation: Pisces
- Right ascension: 00^{h} 05^{m} 52.35^{s}
- Declination: −00° 06′ 55.7″
- Redshift: 5.850
- Distance: 12.684 billion light-years (Light travel time)
- Apparent magnitude (V): 20.5

Other designations
- QSO J0005−0006, SDSS J000552.34−000655.8 (circa 2008), SDSS J000552.35−000655.6 (circa 2006), JFA2008 J000552.34−000655.8

QSO J0005−0006 is a distant quasar in the ~z≥6 regime. It is one of the first two quasars discovered that appear to be "dust-free", the other being QSO J0303−0019. It was the first such discovered, in 2006, and confirmed in the 2010 study.

On 17 March 2010, Xiaohui Fan, an astronomer at the University of Arizona, leader of the team that made the discovery, announced the discovery of two quasars that have dustless spectra. The implication of this result is that the region of space in which they inhabit is primordially pristine, having not been polluted by "dust" created by the first stars. These are thought to represent the earliest generation of quasar. They also announced the next earliest generation of quasar, where dust is detected in proportion to the growth of the galaxy. In more recent quasars, dust is not related to the quasar or galaxy. QSO J0005−0006 was found to be dust free in a 2006 study of distant quasars, and confirmed as such in the 2010 study. The 2010 study removed the potential of masking the dust emission signature occurring, by studying the amount of obscuration of the quasar.

== See also ==
- Stardust
