= SDSS J0303−0019 =

Quasar in the constellation Cetus

Observation data (Epoch J2000.0)
- Constellation: Cetus
- Right ascension: 03^{h} 03^{m} 31.40^{s}
- Declination: −00° 19′ 12.9″
- Redshift: 6.070
- Distance: 12.729 billion light-years (Light travel time); 27.56 billion light-years (Comoving distance)
- Apparent magnitude (V): 23.9

Other designations
- QSO J0303−0019 , SDSS J030331.40−001912.9, JFA2008 J030331.40−001912.9

SDSS J0303−0019 is a distant quasar in the z≥6 regime. It is one of the first two quasars discovered that appear to be "dust-free", the other being QSO J0005−0006.

On 17 March 2010, Xiaohui Fan, an astronomer at the University of Arizona, leader of the team that made the discovery, announced the discovery of two quasars that have dustless spectra. The implication of this result is that the region of space in which they inhabit is primordially pristine, having not been polluted by "dust" created by the first stars. These are thought to represent the earliest type of quasar. They also announced the next earliest class of quasar, where dust is detected in proportion to the growth of the galaxy. In more recent quasars, dust is not related to the quasar or galaxy.

== See also ==
- Stardust
