= Quantum battery =

Quantum device which stores energy

A quantum battery is a type of electric battery that uses the principles of quantum mechanics to store energy. They have the potential to be more efficient and powerful than traditional batteries.

Quantum batteries are in the early stages of development.

== History ==
The concept of quantum batteries was first proposed in 2013. The amount of work that can be produced by a quantum battery is called ergotropy. By making the battery and the device being powered inseparable, such as by using quantum entanglement, more battery output than that having been stored is possible.

The first model proposed for a quantum battery was the Dicke model in 2018. Initially, the Dicke quantum battery appeared to show a quantum advantage in charging power. However, in 2020, it was demonstrated that the battery's Hamiltonian needed to be adjusted. Researchers found that the Dicke quantum battery, in fact, does not provide any quantum advantage.

The SYK quantum battery, proposed in 2020, is the first many-body quantum battery that shows a quantum advantage in the charging process.

Experiments on quantum batteries are in their infancy, and to date, there is no fully functional quantum battery.

== Models ==
=== Dicke Quantum Battery ===
The Dicke quantum battery uses the Dicke model to store energy. This battery was first proposed due to its relation with superradiant emission and its practical feasibility.

The Dicke model describes the collective interaction of an ensemble of N two-level atoms (TLSs) with a single mode of the cavity field. Cavities are typically composed of two or more mirrors that reflect light back and forth, creating a standing wave of electromagnetic radiation, with frequencies determined by the cavity's geometry.

$H_{\text{Dicke}} = \omega_c \hat{a}^\dagger \hat{a} + \omega_0 \sum_{i=1}^{N} \hat{\sigma}i^z + g \sum_{i=1}^{N} \hat{\sigma}_i^x \left( \hat{a}^\dagger + \hat{a} \right)$

The first term describes the energy of the photons. The second term describes the energy of the qubits. The third term describes the interaction between photons and qubits. $g$ is the coupling parameter. This model initially seemed to show that the mean charging power scaled in a super-extensive manner: $\langle P \rangle _t \propto N^{3/2}$. However, this Hamiltonian is not well-defined in the thermodynamic limit ($N \to \infty, V \to \infty$ while keeping $N/V$ constant).

To fix this, it is necessary to substitute: $g \to g_{\text{TD}} = \frac{g}{\sqrt{N}}$ By doing so, scientists found that this battery does not provide any quantum advantage.

=== SYK Quantum Battery ===
The SYK quantum battery uses the Sachdev–Ye–Kitaev model to store energy. This battery uses the direct charging protocol:$H_B(t) = H_B^{(0)} + \lambda(t) \left( H_B^{(1)} - H_B^{(0)} \right)$ where

- $H_B^{(0)} = \sum_{i=0}^N \omega_0\hat{\sigma}_i^y$ is the battery hamiltonian
- $H_B^{(1)} = \sum_{i,j,k,l=1}^{N} J_{i,j,k,l} \hat{c}_i^\dagger \hat{c}_j^\dagger \hat{c}_k \hat{c}_l$ is the interaction hamiltonian.

This is the first many-body model that shows a super extensive charging power. $\langle P \rangle _t \propto N^{3/2}$
