= Quakesat =

Earth Observation nanosatellite

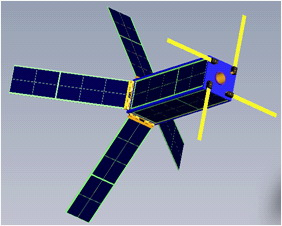
- Mission type: Earth observation
- COSPAR ID: 2003-031F
- SATCAT no.: 27845
- Mission duration: 1 year and 185 days (elapsed)

Spacecraft properties
- Spacecraft: CubeSat
- Spacecraft type: 3 CubeSat
- Manufacturer: QuakeFinder, LLC
- Launch mass: 5 kg (11 lb)

Start of mission
- Launch date: 30 June 2003, 14:15:26 UTC
- Rocket: Rockot/Briz-KM
- Launch site: Plesetsk Cosmodrome, Site 133
- Contractor: Khrunichev State Research and Production Space Center

Orbital parameters
- Reference system: Geocentric orbit
- Regime: Low Earth orbit
- Perigee altitude: 821 km (510 mi)
- Apogee altitude: 833 km (518 mi)
- Inclination: 98.70°
- Period: 101.40 minutes

Instruments
- Magnetometer

Quakesat was an Earth observation nanosatellite based on three CubeSats. It was designed to be a "proof-of-concept" for collecting space-based detection of extremely low frequency signals, theorized to be earthquake precursor signals. The science behind the concept was disputed at the time of launch.

Stanford University and Stellar Solutions released a 10-year, longitudinal study in 2022 in collaboration with Google using earth-based instrumentation that confirmed the science behind the theory for forecasting purposes, but not to the level sufficient to meet the USGS standard of an earthquake prediction.

== Mission ==
The mission goal of Quakesat was to determine if there were any ultra low frequency (ULF) magnetic signals, associated with large earthquakes, that could be detected using a satellite-based, induction magnetometer flying in low-earth-orbit (LEO). QuakeFinder LLC, the company that put the satellites together, was from Palo Alto, California. They were gathering data on the ultra low frequency magnetic field fluctuations that are associated with earthquakes to help better understand this area of study. The primary instrument was a magnetometer housed in a 2 ft (0.6 m) telescoping boom.

On 30 June 2003, deployment of Quakesat was alongside other university CubeSats and one commercial CubeSat. The launch occurred on a Rokot rocket from Russia's Plesetsk Cosmodrome.

The mission was planned to last one year, but ended up lasting 1 and a half years.

== See also ==
- List of CubeSats
