= Quantum defect =

Quantum defect may refer to:

- Quantum defect (lasers), an unavoidable inefficiency in laser beam generation
- The effective nuclear charge correction in hydrogen-like Rydberg atoms
