= Quan-Sheng Shu =

Quan-Sheng Shu (simplified Chinese: 舒全胜; traditional Chinese: 舒全勝) is an American physicist and a naturalized American citizen. Born in China, he has a Ph.D in physics and is also the President of AMAC International, a high-tech company with offices in his hometown of Newport News, Virginia and in Beijing.

Shu came to the United States in 1990. He worked at the University of Washington, in the Superconducting Super Collider project, and at Northrop Grumman. He is known for research in cryogenics.

Shu was arrested and convicted on 17 November 2008 for being involved in the People's Republic of China's systematic effort to upgrade their space exploration and satellite technology capabilities by providing technical expertise and foreign technology acquisition in the fields of cryogenic pumps, valves, transfer lines and refrigeration equipment, components critical for the use of liquefied hydrogen in a launch facility. Shu was sentenced on 7 April 2009 to 51 months (4¼ years) in prison and two years of parole thereafter, and was ordered to forfeit US$386,740 to the federal government. Shu was released on 15 February 2013, and on 18 January 2014 he petitioned for early termination of his parole. His petition was approved by the court on 4 June 2014, making Shu once again a free man.

Shu has started his own consulting company, Cryospc Scientific Consulting. He has services including Proposal Writing, Book Publishing, Paper Preparation, Technical Consulting, & Workshops and Training; you can find out more on his website https://www.cryospc.com/
