= Xiaohui Fan =

American astronomer

- Born: Beijing, China
- Education: Princeton University
- Scientific career
- Fields: Astronomy
- Workplaces: University of Arizona

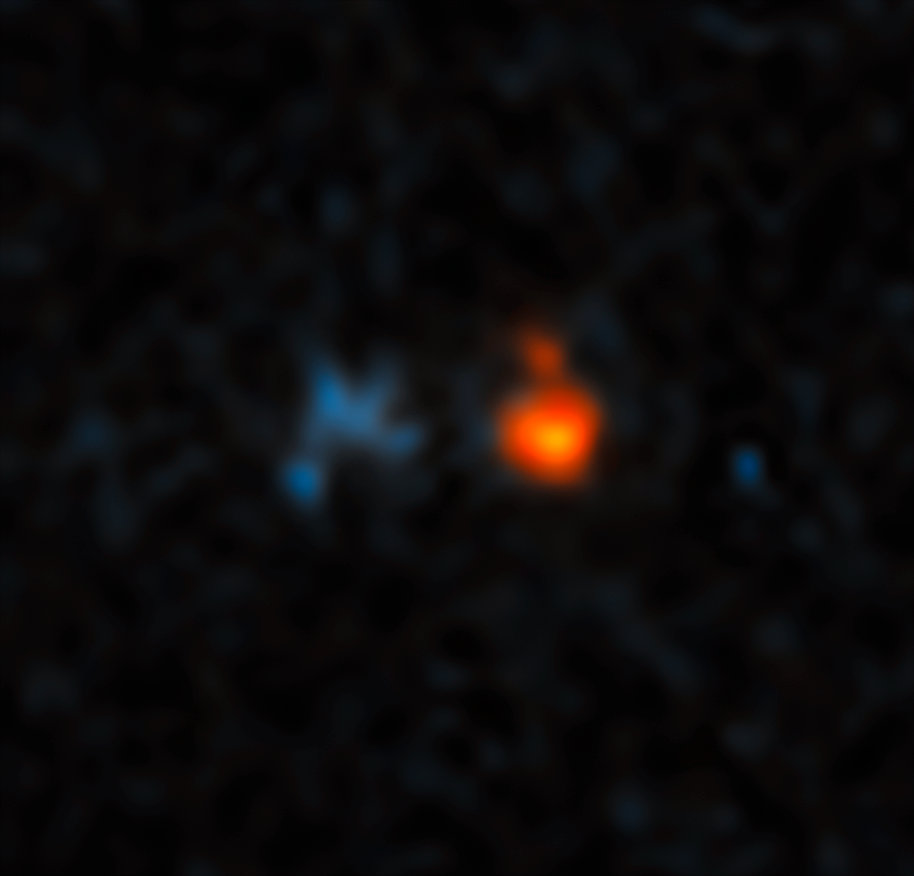
Composite image of QSO J0439+1634, the farthest quasar discovered so far by Xiaohui Fan (2020)

Xiaohui Fan (born 9 December 1971 in Beijing, China) is an American astronomer, and full professor at University of Arizona. He is widely known for his studies on quasars, extremely bright supermassive black holes, detected primarily at high redshift. In 2003, Fan was named to Popular Science magazine's annual Brilliant Ten list for developing methods to investigate distant quasars. Since 2001, he was a pioneer in the detection and discovery of high-redshift quasars, introducing new techniques and practically inventing the field. Using these quasars, he has shown that supermassive black holes with masses up to 10 million solar masses existed within one billion years after the big bang. In 2019, he led an international team of astronomers that discovered the farthest lensed quasar thus far, the very first in the epoch of reionization. In 2021, his team announced the discovery of the most distant and oldest known quasar, QSO J0313–1806.

== Education ==
He graduated from Nanjing University with a B.Sc. (1992) and from the Chinese Academy of Sciences with a M.Sc. (1995). He received his Ph.D. from Princeton University in 2000.

== Awards ==
- 2003 Newton Lacy Pierce Prize in Astronomy, from the American Astronomical Society
- 2008 Guggenheim Fellowship
- 2003 Alfred P. Sloan Research Fellowship
- 2004 David and Lucile Packard Fellowship in Science and Engineering
