= QSO J0439+1634 =

Quasar in the constellation Taurus

J043947.08+163415.7
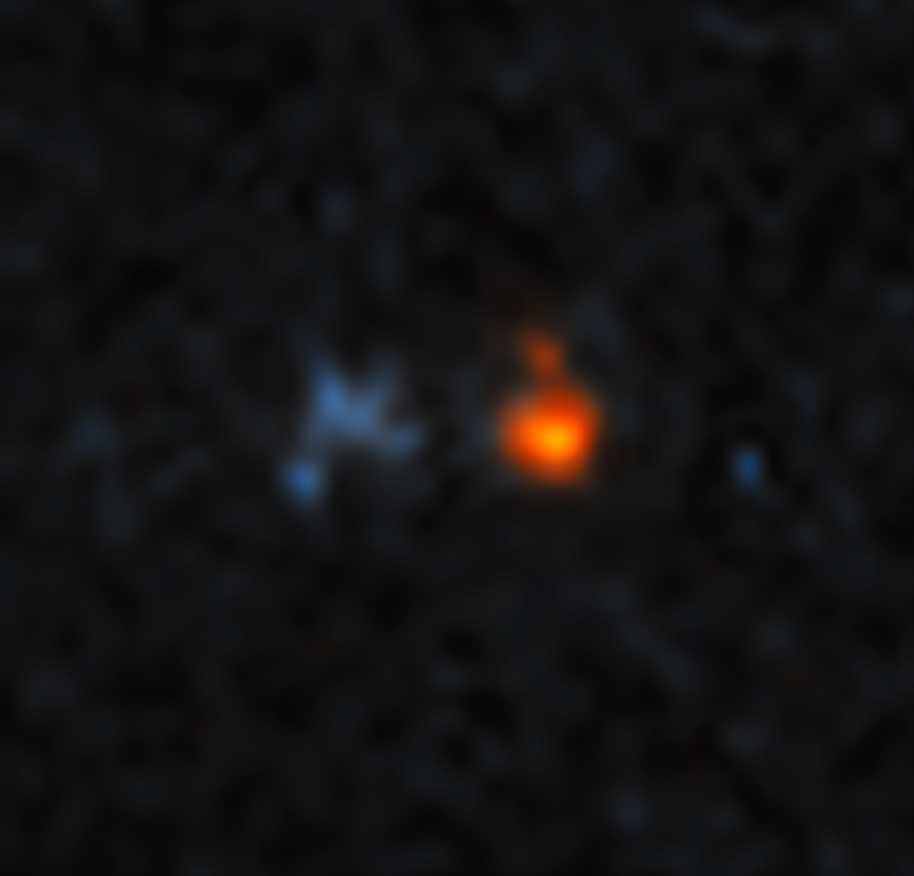
- QSO J0439+1635 (right) with a galaxy in the foreground (left)

Observation data (Epoch )
- Constellation: Taurus
- Right ascension: 04^{h} 39^{m} 47.10^{s}
- Declination: +16° 34′ 15.79″
- Redshift: 6.51
- Distance: 12.873 × 10^{9} LY

Other designations
- 2MASS J04394708+1634160, UHS J043947.08+163415.7, WISEA J043947.09+163415.8

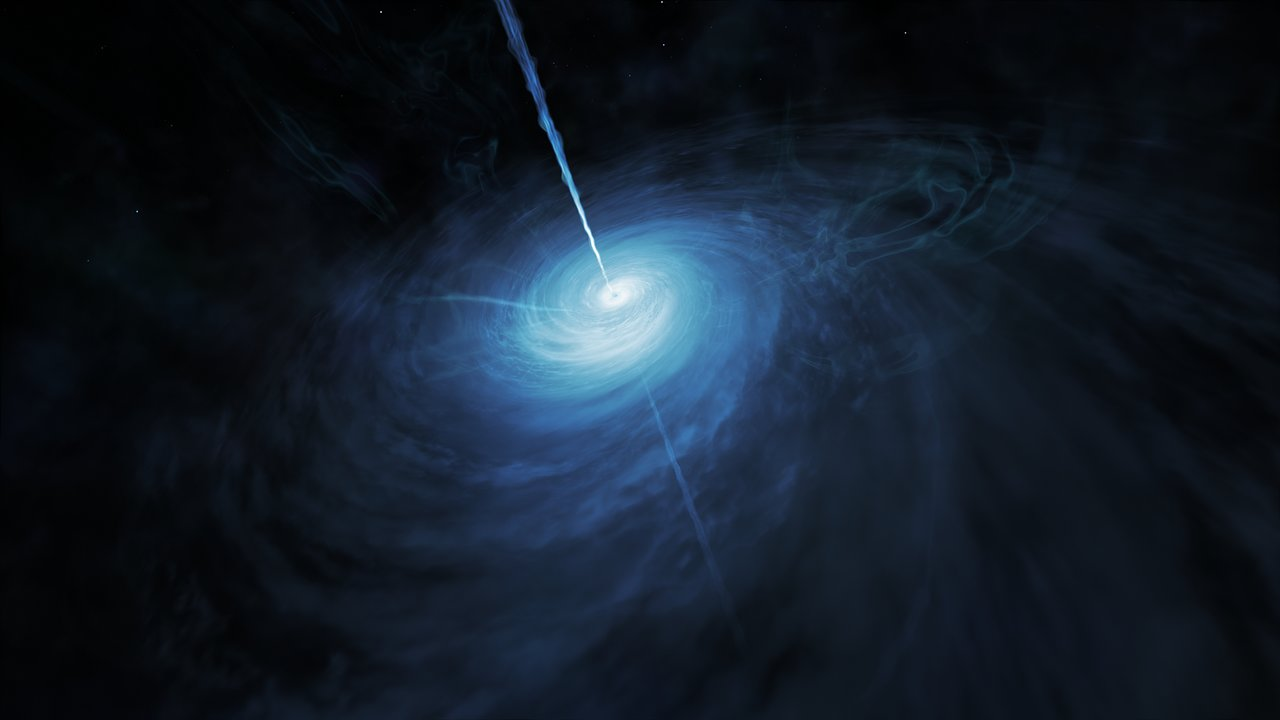
Artist's impression of QSO J0439+1634. Note the prominent blue hue.

QSO J0439+1634, often referred to by just its coordinates, J0439+1634 or J043947.08+163415.7, is a superluminous quasar, and was, until 20 February 2024, (when it was superseded by QSO J0529-4351) considered the brightest quasar in the early universe with a redshift of z = 6.51. It is approximately 12.873 billion light-years away. The brightness of the quasar is equivalent to about 600 trillion luminosities of the Suns with gravitational lensing, without this effect 11 trillion. The quasar-related supermassive black hole has a mass of 700 million solar masses.

== Discovery ==
On April 3, 2018, the ACS/WFC observed and photographed gravitational lensing at the location of the quasar, and further research revealed an extremely bright and large quasar there.
