= QuakeFinder =

QuakeFinder, LLC (QuakeFinder) was a company focused on developing magnetic field sensors (magnetometers) with a mission to save lives by forecasting earthquakes. QuakeFinder operated as an independent company with controlling interest investment from Stellar Solutions, LLC, until its closure in 2008. The company's assets were acquired by Stellar Solutions which continued the research as a humanitarian project until 2023 when data gathering was terminated. QuakeFinder teamed with five organizations in 2022 to publish ten years of earthquake monitoring results that reported "a modest signal 24-72 hours prior to earthquakes" for use in forecasts, but of insufficient accuracy to be used for predictions of earthquakes by time, location and size.

In the 1970s, scientists were optimistic that a practical method to improve forecasting to the level of predicting earthquakes would soon be achieved. By the 1990s continuing failure led USGS scientists to question whether prediction was possible. Extensive searches for possible earthquake precursors were not reliably identified across significant spatial and temporal scales as of 1997. Based on the results of this research, early scientists were pessimistic and some maintained that earthquake prediction was inherently impossible.

QuakeFinder deployed a network of sensor stations to detect the electromagnetic pulses the team believed precede major earthquakes. The sensors were reported to have a range of approximately 10 miles (16 km) from the instrument to the source of the pulses. As of 2016, the company reported 125 stations in California, and their research colleague, Dr. Jorge Heraud (Pontifica Universidad Catolica del Peru) reported 10 sites in Peru. Using these sensors, Dr. Heraud published that he had been able to triangulate pulses seen from multiple sites, in order to determine the origin of the pulses. Dr. Heraud reported that the pulses were seen beginning from 11 to 18 days before an impending earthquake, and could be used to determine the location and timing of future seismic events.

== Background ==
In 2010, QuakeFinder researchers said that they had observed ultra low frequency magnetic pulses emitted by the Earth near the 2007 magnitude 5.4 Alum Rock earthquake near San Jose, California, starting two weeks prior to the event. Researchers from the United States Geological Survey (USGS) had previously attempted to study similar phenomena during the Parkfield earthquake (2007) experiment using an installation of seven (7) magnetometers that differed from the QuakeFinder magnetometers in terms of sensitivity, sample rate and spatial resolution. These researchers did not find evidence of electromagnetic earthquake precursors.

QuakeFinder founder Tom Blier incorporated theory from Dr. Friedemann Freund which posited that slips along a fault activate charge carriers generating signal phenomena including electromagnetic pulses that can be detected with magnetometers. Underground currents may also cause air-conductivity changes and ground heating. QuakeFinder reported that an infrared signature of the Alum Rock earthquake was detected by NASA's GOES weather satellite.

QuakeFinder reported that the effects they studied are localized in time and space, and aimed to improve forecasting by "the time (within 1-2 weeks), location (within 20-40km) and magnitude (within ± 1 increment of Richter magnitude) of earthquake greater than M5.4". This observation capability for forecasting was verified by QuakeFinder's 2022 reported results.

== See also ==
- Earthquake prediction
- Earthquake light
- Earthquake warning system
- Quakesat

== Sources ==
- Console, R. (30 August 2001), "Testing earthquake forecast hypotheses", Tectonophysics, 338 (3–4): 261–268, Bibcode:2001Tectp.338..261C, doi:10.1016/S0040-1951(01)00081-6
- Geller, Robert J. (December 1997), "Earthquake prediction: a critical review." (PDF), Geophysical Journal International, 131 (3): 425–450, Bibcode:1997GeoJI.131..425G, doi:10.1111/j.1365-246X.1997.tb06588.x
- Geller, Robert J.; Jackson, David D.; Kagan, Yan Y.; Mulargia, Francesco (14 March 1997), "Earthquakes Cannot Be Predicted" (PDF), Science, 275 (5306): 1616, doi:10.1126/science.275.5306.1616, S2CID 123516228, archived from the original (PDF) on 12 May 2019
- Kagan, Yan Y. (December 1997b), "Are earthquakes predictable?" (PDF), Geophysical Journal International, 131 (3): 505–525, Bibcode:1997GeoJI.131..505K, doi:10.1111/j.1365-246X.1997.tb06595.x, archived from the original (PDF) on 3 March 2016
- Uyeda, Seiya; Nagao, Toshiyasu; Kamogawa, Masashi (29 May 2009), "Short-term earthquake prediction: Current status of seismo-electromagnetics", Tectonophysics, 470 (3–4): 205–213, Bibcode:2009Tectp.470..205U, doi:10.1016/j.tecto.2008.07.019
