= Horror vacui (philosophy) =

Concept in philosophy and early physics

In philosophy and early physics, horror vacui (Latin: horror of the vacuum) or plenism (/ˈpliːnɪzəm/)—commonly stated as "nature abhors a vacuum", for example by Spinoza—is a hypothesis attributed to Aristotle, later criticized by the atomism of Epicurus and Lucretius, that nature contains no vacuums because the denser surrounding material continuum would immediately fill the rarity of an incipient void.

Aristotle also argued against the void in a more abstract sense: since a void is merely nothingness, following his teacher Plato, nothingness cannot rightly be said to exist. Furthermore, insofar as a void would be featureless, it could neither be encountered by the senses nor could its supposition lend additional explanatory power. Hero of Alexandria challenged the theory in the first century AD, but his attempts to create an artificial vacuum failed. The theory was debated in the context of 17th-century fluid mechanics, by Thomas Hobbes and Robert Boyle, among others, and through the early 18th century by Sir Isaac Newton and Gottfried Leibniz. Evangelista Torricelli created the first known artificial vacuum in 1643 and thus definitively demonstrated the possibility of a true vacuum.

== Origin ==
As advanced by Aristotle in Physics:

In a void, no one could say why a thing once set in motion should stop anywhere; for why should it stop here rather than here? So that a thing will either be at rest or must be moved ad infinitum, unless something more powerful gets in its way.

Further, things are now thought to move into the void because it yields; but in a void this quality is present equally everywhere, so that things should move in all directions.

Further, the truth of what we assert is plain from the following considerations. We see the same weight or body moving faster than another for two reasons, either because there is a difference in what it moves through, as between water, air, and earth, or because, other things being equal, the moving body differs from the other owing to excess of weight or of lightness.

Now the medium causes a difference because it impedes the moving thing, most of all if it is moving in the opposite direction, but in a secondary degree even if it is at rest; and especially a medium that is not easily divided, i.e. a medium that is somewhat dense. A, then, will move through B in time G, and through D, which is thinner, in time E (if the length of B is equal to D), in proportion to the density of the hindering body. For let B be water and D air; then by so much as air is thinner and more incorporeal than water, A will move through D faster than through B. Let the speed have the same ratio to the speed, then, that air has to water. Then if air is twice as thin, the body will traverse B in twice the time that it does D, and the time G will be twice the time E. And always, by so much as the medium is more incorporeal and less resistant and more easily divided, the faster will be the movement.

Now there is no ratio in which the void is exceeded by body, as there is no ratio of 0 to a number. For if 4 exceeds 3 by 1, and 2 by more than 1, and 1 by still more than it exceeds 2, still there is no ratio by which it exceeds 0; for that which exceeds must be divisible into the excess + that which is exceeded, so that will be what it exceeds 0 by + 0. For this reason, too, a line does not exceed a point unless it is composed of points! Similarly the void can bear no ratio to the full, and therefore neither can movement through the one to movement through the other, but if a thing moves through the thickest medium such and such a distance in such and such a time, it moves through the void with a speed beyond any ratio. For let Z be void, equal in magnitude to B and to D. Then if A is to traverse and move through it in a certain time, H, a time less than E, however, the void will bear this ratio to the full. But in a time equal to H, A will traverse the part O of A. And it will surely also traverse in that time any substance Z which exceeds air in thickness in the ratio which the time E bears to the time H. For if the body Z be as much thinner than D as E exceeds H, A, if it moves through Z, will traverse it in a time inverse to the speed of the movement, i.e. in a time equal to H. If, then, there is no body in Z, A will traverse Z still more quickly. But we supposed that its traverse of Z when Z was void occupied the time H. So that it will traverse Z in an equal time whether Z be full or void. But this is impossible. It is plain, then, that if there is a time in which it will move through any part of the void, this impossible result will follow: it will be found to traverse a certain distance, whether this be full or void, in an equal time; for there will be some body which is in the same ratio to the other body as the time is to the time.

— Aristotle, Physics, Book IV, section 8

== Etymology ==
Plenism means "fullness", from Latin plēnum, English "plenty", cognate via Proto-Indo-European to "full". In Ancient Greek, the term for the void is τὸ κενόν (to kenón).

== History ==
The idea was restated as "Natura abhorret vacuum" by François Rabelais in his series of books titled Gargantua and Pantagruel in the 1530s. The theory was supported and restated by Galileo Galilei in the early 17th century as "Resistenza del vacuo". Galileo was surprised by the fact that water could not rise above a certain level in an aspiration tube in his suction pump, leading him to conclude that there is a limit to the phenomenon. René Descartes proposed a plenic interpretation of atomism to eliminate the void, which he considered incompatible with his concept of space. The theory was rejected by later scientists, such as Galileo's pupil Evangelista Torricelli, who repeated his experiment with mercury. Blaise Pascal successfully repeated Galileo's and Torricelli's experiment and foresaw no reason why a perfect vacuum could not be achieved in principle. Scottish philosopher Thomas Carlyle mentioned Pascal's experiment in the Edinburgh Encyclopædia in an 1823 article titled "Pascal".

== See also ==
- Casimir effect
- Inertia
- Lamb shift
- QCD vacuum
- QED vacuum
- Quantum fluctuation
- Quantum vacuum state
- Spontaneous emission
- Vacuum
- Vacuum permittivity
- Vacuum Rabi oscillation
