= Electromagnetic field =

Electric and magnetic fields produced by moving charged objects

An electromagnetic field (also EM field) is a physical field, varying in space and time, that represents the electric and magnetic influences generated by and acting upon electric charges. The field at any point in space and time can be regarded as a combination of an electric field and a magnetic field. Because of the interrelationship between the fields, a disturbance in the electric field can create a disturbance in the magnetic field which in turn affects the electric field, leading to an oscillation that propagates through space, known as an electromagnetic wave.

Mathematically, the electromagnetic field is a pair of vector fields consisting of one vector for the electric field and one for the magnetic field at each point in space. The vectors may change over time and space in accordance with Maxwell's equations. The vectors are subject to the rules of special relativity; different observers may determine different vectors.

The way in which charges and currents (i.e. streams of charges) interact with the electromagnetic field is described by Maxwell's equations and the Lorentz force law. Maxwell's equations detail how the electric field converges towards or diverges away from electric charges, how the magnetic field curls around electrical currents, and how changes in the electric and magnetic fields influence each other. The Lorentz force law states that a charge subject to an electric field feels a force along the direction of the field, and a charge moving through a magnetic field feels a force that is perpendicular both to the magnetic field and to its direction of motion.

The electromagnetic field is described by classical electrodynamics, an example of a classical field theory. This theory describes many macroscopic physical phenomena accurately. However, it was unable to explain the photoelectric effect and atomic absorption spectroscopy, experiments at the atomic scale. That required the use of quantum mechanics, specifically the quantization of the electromagnetic field and the development of quantum electrodynamics.

== History ==
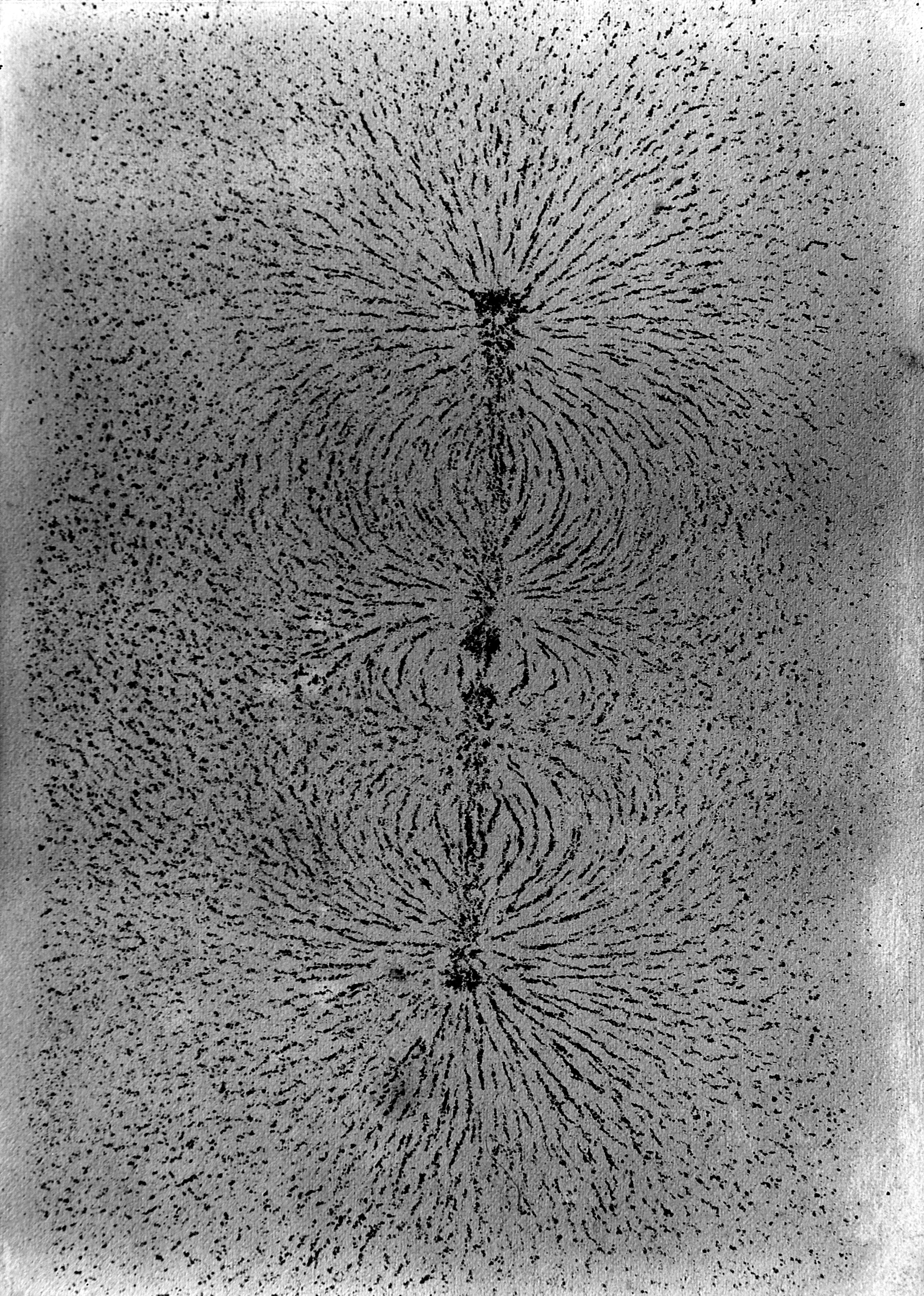
Results of Michael Faraday's iron filings experiment.

The empirical investigation of electromagnetism is at least as old as the ancient Greek philosopher, mathematician and scientist Thales of Miletus, who around 600 BCE described his experiments rubbing fur of animals on various materials such as amber creating static electricity. By the 18th century, it was understood that objects can carry positive or negative electric charge, that two objects carrying charge of the same sign repel each other, that two objects carrying charges of opposite sign attract one another, and that the strength of this force falls off as the square of the distance between them. Michael Faraday visualized this in terms of the charges interacting via the electric field. An electric field is produced when the charge is stationary with respect to an observer measuring the properties of the charge, and a magnetic field as well as an electric field are produced when the charge moves, creating an electric current with respect to this observer. Over time, it was realized that the electric and magnetic fields are better thought of as two parts of a greater whole—the electromagnetic field. In 1820, Hans Christian Ørsted showed that an electric current can deflect a nearby compass needle, establishing that electricity and magnetism are closely related phenomena. Faraday then made the seminal observation that time-varying magnetic fields could induce electric currents in 1831.

In 1861, James Clerk Maxwell synthesized all the work to date on electrical and magnetic phenomena into a single mathematical theory, from which he then deduced that light is an electromagnetic wave. Maxwell's continuous field theory was very successful until evidence supporting the atomic model of matter emerged. Beginning in 1877, Hendrik Lorentz developed an atomic model of electromagnetism and in 1897 J. J. Thomson completed experiments that defined the electron. The Lorentz theory works for free charges in electromagnetic fields, but fails to predict the energy spectrum for bound charges in atoms and molecules. For that problem, quantum mechanics is needed, ultimately leading to the theory of quantum electrodynamics.

Practical applications of the new understanding of electromagnetic fields emerged in the late 1800s. The electrical generator and motor were invented using only the empirical findings like Faraday's and Ampere's laws combined with practical experience.

== Mathematical description ==
There are different mathematical ways of representing the electromagnetic field. The first one views the electric and magnetic fields as three-dimensional vector fields. These vector fields each have a value defined at every point of space and time and are thus often regarded as functions of the space and time coordinates. As such, they are often written as E(x, y, z, t) (electric field) and B(x, y, z, t) (magnetic field).

If only the electric field (E) is non-zero, and is constant in time, the field is said to be an electrostatic field. Similarly, if only the magnetic field (B) is non-zero and is constant in time, the field is said to be a magnetostatic field. However, if either the electric or magnetic field has a time-dependence, then both fields must be considered together as a coupled electromagnetic field using Maxwell's equations.

With the advent of special relativity, physical laws became amenable to the formalism of tensors. Maxwell's equations can be written in tensor form, generally viewed by physicists as a more elegant means of expressing physical laws.

The behavior of electric and magnetic fields, whether in cases of electrostatics, magnetostatics, or electrodynamics (electromagnetic fields), is governed by Maxwell's equations. In the vector field formalism, these are:

Gauss's law
$$\nabla \cdot \mathbf{E} = \frac{\rho}{\varepsilon_0}$$
Gauss's law for magnetism
$$\nabla \cdot \mathbf{B} = 0$$
Faraday's law
$$\nabla \times \mathbf{E} = -\frac {\partial \mathbf{B}}{\partial t}$$
Ampère–Maxwell law
$$\nabla \times \mathbf{B} = \mu_0 \mathbf{J} + \mu_0\varepsilon_0 \frac{\partial \mathbf{E}}{\partial t}$$

where $\rho$ is the charge density, which is a function of time and position, $\varepsilon_0$ is the vacuum permittivity, $\mu_0$ is the vacuum permeability, and J is the current density vector, also a function of time and position. Inside a linear material, Maxwell's equations change by switching the permeability and permittivity of free space with the permeability and permittivity of the linear material in question. Inside other materials which possess more complex responses to electromagnetic fields, these terms are often represented by complex numbers, or tensors.

The Lorentz force law governs the interaction of the electromagnetic field with charged matter.

When a field travels across to different media, the behavior of the field changes according to the properties of the media.

== Properties of the field ==
=== Electrostatics and magnetostatics ===
Electric field of a positive point electric charge suspended over an infinite sheet of conducting material. The field is depicted by electric field lines, lines which follow the direction of the electric field in space.

The Maxwell equations simplify when the charge density at each point in space does not change over time and all electric currents likewise remain constant. All of the time derivatives vanish from the equations, leaving two expressions that involve the electric field,
$$\nabla \cdot \mathbf{E} = \frac{\rho}{\epsilon_0}$$
and
$$\nabla\times\mathbf{E} = 0,$$
along with two formulae that involve the magnetic field:
$$\nabla \cdot \mathbf{B} = 0$$
and
$$\nabla \times \mathbf{B} = \mu_0 \mathbf{J}.$$
These expressions are the basic equations of electrostatics, which focuses on situations where electrical charges do not move, and magnetostatics, the corresponding area of magnetic phenomena.

=== Transformations of electromagnetic fields ===
Whether a physical effect is attributable to an electric field or to a magnetic field is dependent upon the observer, in a way that special relativity makes mathematically precise. For example, suppose that a laboratory contains a long straight wire that carries an electrical current. In the frame of reference where the laboratory is at rest, the wire is motionless and electrically neutral: the current, composed of negatively charged electrons, moves against a background of positively charged ions, and the densities of positive and negative charges cancel each other out. A test charge near the wire would feel no electrical force from the wire. However, if the test charge is in motion parallel to the current, the situation changes. In the rest frame of the test charge, the positive and negative charges in the wire are moving at different speeds, and so the positive and negative charge distributions are Lorentz-contracted by different amounts. Consequently, the wire has a nonzero net charge density, and the test charge must experience a nonzero electric field and thus a nonzero force. In the rest frame of the laboratory, there is no electric field to explain the test charge being pulled towards or pushed away from the wire. So, an observer in the laboratory rest frame concludes that a magnetic field must be present.

In general, a situation that one observer describes using only an electric field will be described by an observer in a different inertial frame using a combination of electric and magnetic fields. Analogously, a phenomenon that one observer describes using only a magnetic field will be, in a relatively moving reference frame, described by a combination of fields. The rules for relating the fields required in different reference frames are the Lorentz transformations of the fields.

Thus, electrostatics and magnetostatics are now seen as studies of the static EM field when a particular frame has been selected to suppress the other type of field, and since an EM field with both electric and magnetic will appear in any other frame, these "simpler" effects are merely a consequence of different frames of measurement. The fact that the two field variations can be reproduced just by changing the motion of the observer is further evidence that there is only a single actual field involved which is simply being observed differently.

=== Reciprocal behavior of electric and magnetic fields ===
The two Maxwell equations, Faraday's Law and the Ampère–Maxwell Law, illustrate a very practical feature of the electromagnetic field. Faraday's Law may be stated roughly as "a changing magnetic field inside a loop creates an electric voltage around the loop". This is the principle behind the electric generator.

Ampere's Law roughly states that "an electrical current around a loop creates a magnetic field through the loop". Thus, this law can be applied to generate a magnetic field and run an electric motor.

=== Behavior of the fields in the absence of charges or currents ===
A linearly polarized electromagnetic plane wave propagating parallel to the z-axis is a possible solution for the electromagnetic wave equations in free space. The electric field, E, and the magnetic field, B, are perpendicular to each other and the direction of propagation.

Maxwell's equations can be combined to derive wave equations. The solutions of these equations take the form of an electromagnetic wave. In a volume of space not containing charges or currents (free space) – that is, where $\rho$ and J are zero, the electric and magnetic fields satisfy these electromagnetic wave equations:

$$\left( \nabla^2 - { 1 \over {c}^2 } {\partial^2 \over \partial t^2} \right) \mathbf{E} \ \ = \ \ 0$$
$$\left( \nabla^2 - { 1 \over {c}^2 } {\partial^2 \over \partial t^2} \right) \mathbf{B} \ \ = \ \ 0$$

James Clerk Maxwell was the first to obtain this relationship by his completion of Maxwell's equations with the addition of a displacement current term to Ampere's circuital law. This unified the physical understanding of electricity, magnetism, and light: visible light is but one portion of the full range of electromagnetic waves, the electromagnetic spectrum.

=== Time-varying EM fields in Maxwell's equations ===
An electromagnetic field very far from currents and charges (sources) is called electromagnetic radiation (EMR) since it radiates from the charges and currents in the source. Such radiation can occur across a wide range of frequencies called the electromagnetic spectrum, including radio waves, microwave, infrared, visible light, ultraviolet light, X-rays, and gamma rays. The many commercial applications of these radiations are discussed in the named and linked articles.

A notable application of visible light is that this type of energy from the Sun powers all life on Earth that either makes or uses oxygen.

A changing electromagnetic field which is physically close to currents and charges (see near and far field for a definition of "close") will have a dipole characteristic that is dominated by either a changing electric dipole, or a changing magnetic dipole. This type of dipole field near sources is called an electromagnetic near-field.

Changing electric dipole fields, as such, are used commercially as near-fields mainly as a source of dielectric heating. Otherwise, they appear parasitically around conductors which absorb EMR, and around antennas which have the purpose of generating EMR at greater distances.

Changing magnetic dipole fields (i.e., magnetic near-fields) are used commercially for many types of magnetic induction devices. These include motors and electrical transformers at low frequencies, and devices such as RFID tags, metal detectors, and MRI scanner coils at higher frequencies.

== Health and safety ==
The potential effects of electromagnetic fields on human health vary widely depending on the frequency, intensity of the fields, and the length of the exposure. Low frequency, low intensity, and short duration exposure to electromagnetic radiation is generally considered safe. On the other hand, radiation from other parts of the electromagnetic spectrum, such as ultraviolet light and gamma rays, are known to cause significant harm in some circumstances.

== See also ==
- Classification of electromagnetic fields
- Electric field
- Electromagnetism
- Electromagnetic propagation
- Electromagnetic radiation
- Electromagnetic spectrum
- Electromagnetic field measurements
- Magnetic field
- Maxwell's equations
- Photoelectric effect
- Photon
- Quantization of the electromagnetic field
- Quantum electrodynamics
