= Quantum vacuum state =

Quantum state with the lowest possible energy

Energy levels for an electron in an atom: ground state and excited states. In quantum field theory, the ground state is usually called the vacuum state or the vacuum.

In quantum field theory, the quantum vacuum state (also called the quantum vacuum or vacuum state) is the quantum state with the lowest possible energy. Generally, it contains no physical particles. However, the quantum vacuum is not a simple empty space, but instead contains fleeting electromagnetic waves and particles that pop into and out of the quantum field.

The QED vacuum of quantum electrodynamics (or QED) was the first vacuum of quantum field theory to be developed. QED originated in the 1930s, and in the late 1940s and early 1950s, it was reformulated by Feynman, Tomonaga, and Schwinger, who jointly received the Nobel prize for this work in 1965. Today, the electromagnetic interactions and the weak interactions are unified (at very high energies only) in the theory of the electroweak interaction.

The Standard Model is a generalization of the QED work to include all the known elementary particles and their interactions (except gravity). Quantum chromodynamics (or QCD) is the portion of the Standard Model that deals with strong interactions, and the QCD vacuum is the vacuum of quantum chromodynamics. It is the object of study in the Large Hadron Collider and the Relativistic Heavy Ion Collider, and is related to the so-called vacuum structure of strong interactions.

== Non-zero expectation value ==
The video of an experiment showing vacuum fluctuations (in the red ring) amplified by spontaneous parametric down-conversion.

If the quantum field theory can be accurately described through perturbation theory, then the properties of the vacuum are analogous to the properties of the ground state of a quantum mechanical harmonic oscillator, or more accurately, the ground state of a measurement problem. In this case, the vacuum expectation value of any field operator vanishes. For quantum field theories in which perturbation theory breaks down at low energies (for example, Quantum chromodynamics or the BCS theory of superconductivity), field operators may obtain non-vanishing vacuum expectation values by spontaneous symmetry breaking. In the Standard Model, the Higgs field acquires a non-zero expectation value when the electroweak symmetry is broken, and this explains part of the masses of other particles.

== Energy ==
The vacuum state is associated with a zero-point energy, and this zero-point energy (equivalent to the lowest possible energy state) has measurable effects. It may be detected as the Casimir effect in the laboratory. In physical cosmology, the energy of the cosmological vacuum appears as the cosmological constant. The energy of a cubic centimeter of empty space has been calculated figuratively to be one trillionth of an erg (or 0.6 eV). An outstanding requirement imposed on a potential Theory of Everything is that the energy of the quantum vacuum state must explain the physically observed cosmological constant.

== Symmetry ==
For a relativistic field theory, the vacuum is Poincaré invariant, which follows from Wightman axioms but can also be proved directly without these axioms. Poincaré invariance implies that only scalar combinations of field operators have non-vanishing vacuum expectation values. The vacuum may break some of the internal symmetries of the Lagrangian of the field theory. In this case, the vacuum has less symmetry than the theory allows, and one says that spontaneous symmetry breaking has occurred.

== Non-linear permittivity ==
Quantum corrections to Maxwell's equations are expected to result in a tiny nonlinear electric polarization term in the vacuum, resulting in a field-dependent electrical permittivity ε deviating from the nominal value ε_{0} of vacuum permittivity. These theoretical developments are described, for example, in Dittrich and Gies. The theory of quantum electrodynamics predicts that the QED vacuum should exhibit a slight nonlinearity so that in the presence of a very strong electric field, the permittivity is increased by a tiny amount with respect to ε_{0}. Subject to ongoing experimental efforts is the possibility that a strong electric field would modify the effective permeability of free space, becoming anisotropic with a value slightly below μ_{0} in the direction of the electric field and slightly exceeding μ_{0} in the perpendicular direction. The quantum vacuum exposed to an electric field exhibits birefringence for an electromagnetic wave traveling in a direction other than the electric field. The effect is similar to the Kerr effect but without matter being present. This tiny nonlinearity can be interpreted in terms of virtual pair production. A characteristic electric field strength for which the nonlinearities become sizable is predicted to be enormous, about $1.32 \times 10^{18}$V/m, known as the Schwinger limit; the equivalent Kerr constant has been estimated, being about 10^{20} times smaller than the Kerr constant of water. Explanations for dichroism from particle physics, outside quantum electrodynamics, also have been proposed. Experimentally measuring such an effect is challenging, and has not yet been successful.

== Virtual particles ==
The presence of virtual particles can be rigorously based upon the non-commutation of the quantized electromagnetic fields. Non-commutation means that although the average values of the fields vanish in a quantum vacuum, their variances do not. The term "vacuum fluctuations" refers to the variance of the field strength in the minimal energy state, and is described picturesquely as evidence of "virtual particles". It is sometimes attempted to provide an intuitive picture of virtual particles, or variances, based upon the Heisenberg energy-time uncertainty principle:
$$\Delta E \Delta t \ge \frac{\hbar}{2} \, ,$$
(with ΔE and Δt being the energy and time variations respectively; ΔE is the accuracy in the measurement of energy and Δt is the time taken in the measurement, and ħ is the Reduced Planck constant) arguing along the lines that the short lifetime of virtual particles allows the "borrowing" of large energies from the vacuum and thus permits particle generation for short times. Although the phenomenon of virtual particles is accepted, this interpretation of the energy-time uncertainty relation is not universal. One issue is the use of an uncertainty relation limiting measurement accuracy as though a time uncertainty Δt determines a "budget" for borrowing energy ΔE. Another issue is the meaning of "time" in this relation because energy and time (unlike position q and momentum p, for example) do not satisfy a canonical commutation relation (such as [q, p] = i ħ). Various schemes have been advanced to construct an observable that has some kind of time interpretation, and yet does satisfy a canonical commutation relation with energy. Many approaches to the energy-time uncertainty principle are a long and continuing subject.

== Physical nature of the quantum vacuum ==
According to Astrid Lambrecht (2002): "When one empties out a space of all matter and lowers the temperature to absolute zero, one produces in a Gedankenexperiment [thought experiment] the quantum vacuum state." According to Fowler & Guggenheim (1939/1965), the third law of thermodynamics may be precisely enunciated as follows:

It is impossible by any procedure, no matter how idealized, to reduce any assembly to the absolute zero in a finite number of operations. (See also.)

Photon-photon interaction can occur only through interaction with the vacuum state of some other field, such as the Dirac electron-positron vacuum field; this is associated with the concept of vacuum polarization. According to Milonni (1994): "... all quantum fields have zero-point energies and vacuum fluctuations." This means that there is a component of the quantum vacuum respectively for each component field (considered in the conceptual absence of the other fields), such as the electromagnetic field, the Dirac electron-positron field, and so on. According to Milonni (1994), some of the effects attributed to the vacuum electromagnetic field can have several physical interpretations, some more conventional than others. The Casimir attraction between uncharged conductive plates is often proposed as an example of an effect of the vacuum electromagnetic field. Schwinger, DeRaad, and Milton (1978) are cited by Milonni (1994) as validly, though unconventionally, explaining the Casimir effect with a model in which "the vacuum is regarded as truly a state with all physical properties equal to zero." In this model, the observed phenomena are explained as the effects of the electron motions on the electromagnetic field, called the source field effect. Milonni writes:

The basic idea here will be that the Casimir force may be derived from the source fields alone even in completely conventional QED, ... Milonni provides detailed argument that the measurable physical effects usually attributed to the vacuum electromagnetic field cannot be explained by that field alone, but require in addition a contribution from the self-energy of the electrons, or their radiation reaction. He writes: "The radiation reaction and the vacuum fields are two aspects of the same thing when it comes to physical interpretations of various QED processes including the Lamb shift, van der Waals forces, and Casimir effects."

This point of view is also stated by Jaffe (2005): "The Casimir force can be calculated without reference to vacuum fluctuations, and like all other observable effects in QED, it vanishes as the fine structure constant, α, goes to zero."

== See also ==
- Pair production
- Vacuum energy
- Lamb shift
- False vacuum decay
- Squeezed coherent state
- Quantum fluctuation
- Scharnhorst effect
- Van der Waals force
- Casimir effect
