= Hsieh Yu-Ming =

Chinese physicist and educator (1893-1986)

- 謝玉銘
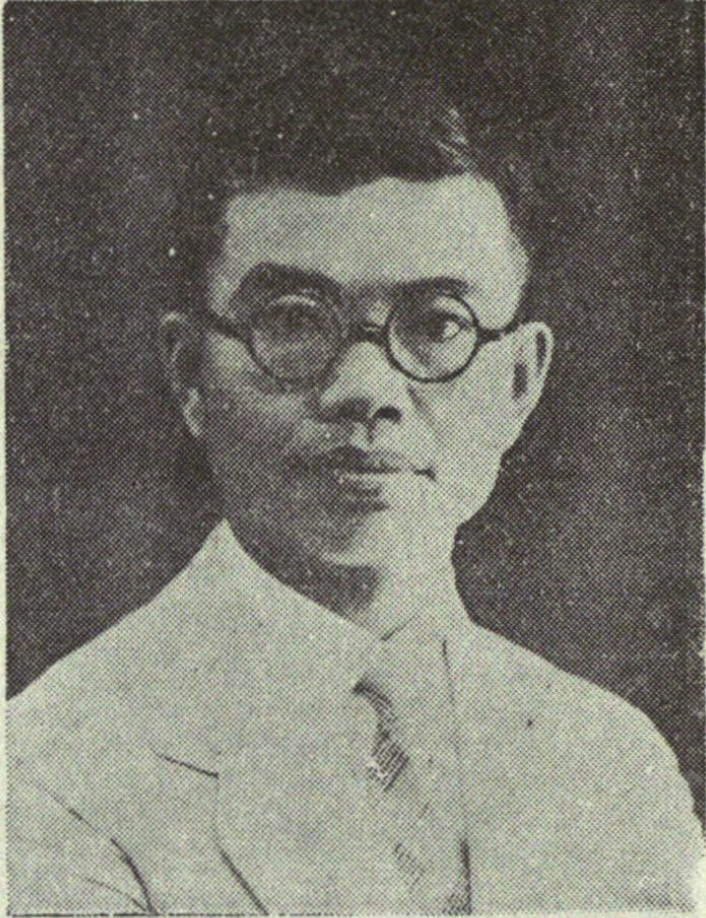
- Hsieh Yu-Ming in 1936
- Born: June 5, 1893; Jinjiang, Fujian, Qing dynasty China
- Died: March 20, 1986 (aged 92); Taipei, Taiwan
- Other names: Xie Yuming, Y. M. Hsieh
- Education: Yenching University (BA); Columbia University (MA); University of Chicago (PhD)
- Occupations: Physicist, educator
- Known for: Pioneering modern physics education in Republican China; early work on fine structure of hydrogen with William V. Houston
- Notable work: Principles and Applications of Physics (1925)
- Spouses: Guo Yujin (郭瑜谨) (m. ?); Zhang Shunying (张舜英) (m. 1928)
- Children: 4, including physicist Xie Xide
- Scientific career
- Workplaces: Peiyuan Middle School; Yenching University; California Institute of Technology; Hunan University; Xiamen University; University of the East
- Doctoral advisor: Albert A. Michelson

Hsieh Yu-Ming (simplified Chinese: 谢玉铭; traditional Chinese: 謝玉銘; pinyin: Xiè Yùmíng; June 5, 1893 – March 20, 1986), also known as Xie Yuming or Y. M. Hsieh, was a Chinese physicist and educator who contributed to the development of modern physics education in the Republic of China and conducted spectroscopic research that anticipated the discovery of the Lamb shift.

Educated at Columbia University and the University of Chicago under Nobel laureate Albert A. Michelson, Hsieh served as chair of the Physics Department at Yenching University, where he helped establish China's first graduate physics program. During a 1932–1934 fellowship at the California Institute of Technology, he collaborated with William V. Houston on measurements of hydrogen spectral lines that identified discrepancies later explained by quantum electrodynamics. He later taught at Xiamen University during the Second Sino-Japanese War and worked in the Philippines, where he contributed to the country's early atomic energy initiatives.

== Early life and education ==
Hsieh Yuming was born on June 5, 1893, in Zhixiang Village, Jinjiang, Fujian Province (present-day Shishi City). He lost his father at age four and moved with his mother to Quanzhou, where she supported the family through embroidery and washing work for the local church. He attended Peiyuan Middle School, a Christian school in Quanzhou founded by British Presbyterian missionary A. S. Moore Anderson, who recognized his academic talents and recommended him to Peking Union College (later Yenching University), where tuition was waived due to his family's financial circumstances.

At Yenching, Hsieh excelled in physics, mathematics, and English, representing the university in Beijing intercollegiate English debates. After graduating in 1917, he briefly taught at Peiyuan Middle School before joining the Yenching University faculty in 1921.

In the early 1920s, Hsieh received a Rockefeller Foundation Fellowship to pursue graduate studies in the United States. He obtained a master's degree from Columbia University in 1924, followed by a Ph.D. in physics from the University of Chicago in 1926 under the supervision of Albert A. Michelson, the 1907 Nobel laureate.

== Academic career ==
=== Yenching University (1926–1937) ===
After completing his doctorate, Hsieh returned to China and was appointed professor of physics at Yenching University in Beijing. He became the first Chinese chairman of the Department of Physics, succeeding American physicist Paul A. Anderson. Under his leadership, Yenching became one of the leading centers for physics education in China. The department established China's first Master of Science program in physics in 1927, training future prominent physicists including Chu Sheng-Lin.

=== Research at Caltech (1932–1934) ===
From 1932 to 1934, Hsieh held a visiting research fellowship at the California Institute of Technology, where he collaborated with William V. Houston on spectroscopic investigations of hydrogen.

==== Houston-Hsieh experiment ====
In 1933–1934, Houston and Hsieh investigated the fine structure of the Balmer lines of hydrogen using improved interferometric techniques. Their measurements revealed discrepancies of approximately 3% between experimental results and theoretical predictions based on the Dirac equation. Significantly, Houston and Hsieh concluded that "the discrepancy may lie in the neglect of the radiation reaction in the calculation of the energy levels," an early identification of what would later be understood as the self-energy correction underlying the Lamb shift. Their work was inspired by remarks from J. Robert Oppenheimer and Niels Bohr concerning the neglect of radiation field effects in contemporary theoretical calculations.

Despite the significance of their interpretation, the paper received little attention at the time. The phenomenon was later definitively measured by Willis Lamb and Robert Retherford in 1947, for which Lamb received the Nobel Prize in Physics in 1955. Nobel laureate Yang Chen-Ning later wrote that the Houston-Hsieh work was notable for its prescient identification of quantum electrodynamic effects.

=== Wartime service at Xiamen University (1937–1946) ===
Following the outbreak of the Second Sino-Japanese War in July 1937, Hsieh and his family left Beijing. After briefly teaching at Hunan University, he accepted an invitation in November 1939 from Sa Bendong, president of Xiamen University, to join the institution as professor of physics. At the time, Xiamen University had relocated to Changting, Fujian Province, to escape Japanese occupation.

At Changting, Hsieh maintained physics education under austere wartime conditions, building machine shops and laboratories despite resource shortages. He played a role in maintaining academic standards during one of the most turbulent periods in modern Chinese history. After Japan's surrender in 1945, Xiamen University returned to its original coastal campus, where Hsieh continued teaching until his departure for the Philippines.

== Career in the Philippines (1950–1968) ==
After leaving China around 1950, Hsieh moved to the Philippines, joining the University of the East in Manila as professor and chairman of the Department of Physics, remaining in this position until 1968.

=== Nuclear energy initiatives ===
In 1956, following U.S. President Eisenhower's Atoms for Peace program, the Philippine Nuclear Research and Training Association formed a Nuclear Committee to advise on nuclear research facilities and training programs. Hsieh was appointed to this committee alongside Dr. Theodor Brings (Chairman), Dr. Ciriaco Pedrosa, Dr. Hans Scharpenseel, and Brother Howard Edwards. The committee contributed to shaping the Philippines' early nuclear education and research agenda.

=== Nanyang University Commission ===
In 1959, Hsieh was selected by the Singapore government to serve on the Nanyang University Commission, a panel charged with evaluating the academic standards of Nanyang University. The commission was chaired by Sir Stanley Lewis Prescott and also included A. F. P. Hulsewé of Leiden University, Chien Shih-liang of National Taiwan University, and William Hung of the Harvard-Yenching Institute.

== Personal life ==
Hsieh married twice. His first wife, Guo Yujin, died of typhoid fever while he was studying in America. He later married Zhang Shunying in 1928, a longtime middle school teacher.

Hsieh had four children, all of whom pursued distinguished academic careers:

Xie Xide (1921–2000) earned a master's degree from Smith College (1949) and Ph.D. from MIT (1951), became a leading semiconductor physicist, and served as President of Fudan University (1983–1988), the first woman to head a major comprehensive university in the People's Republic of China.

Xie Xiwen graduated from Xiamen University and became a professor of materials science at Beihang University.

Xie Xiren (born 1931) graduated from Tsinghua University in 1952 and became a leading communications and computer network expert, serving as professor at PLA Information Engineering University.

Xie Xizhe worked as a senior engineer with the Xinjiang Agricultural Reclamation Bureau.

Hsieh died on March 20, 1986, in Taipei, Taiwan, at the age of 92. In 1987, physicists Chu Sheng-ling and Wu Ziqin published an obituary describing him as "a senior generation physicist of our country."

== Legacy ==
Hsieh was part of the generation of Western-trained Chinese scientists who established modern physics education in China during the Republican era. His work at Yenching University helped train the first generation of Chinese physicists, while his wartime service at Xiamen University preserved physics education during the Japanese occupation. The Houston-Hsieh experiment remains recognized in physics history as an early observation of quantum electrodynamic effects that would later be explained through the Lamb shift.

== Selected publications ==
Houston, W. V.; Hsieh, Y. M. (1934). "The Fine Structure of the Balmer Lines". Physical Review. 45 (4): 263–272. Bibcode:1934PhRv...45..263H. doi:10.1103/PhysRev.45.263.

== See also ==
- History of science and technology in China
