= Precision tests of QED =

Verifying quantum electrodynamics by measuring the fine-structure constant

Quantum electrodynamics (QED), a relativistic quantum field theory of electrodynamics, is among the most stringently tested theories in physics. The most precise and specific tests of QED consist of measurements of the electromagnetic fine-structure constant, α, in various physical systems. Checking the consistency of such measurements tests the theory.

Tests of a theory are normally carried out by comparing experimental results to theoretical predictions. In QED, there is some subtlety in this comparison, because theoretical predictions require as input an extremely precise value of α, which can only be obtained from another precision QED experiment. Because of this, the comparisons between theory and experiment are usually quoted as independent determinations of α. QED is then confirmed to the extent that these measurements of α from different physical sources agree with each other.

The agreement found this way is to within less than one part in a billion (10^{−9}). An extremely high precision measurement of the quantized energies of the cyclotron orbits of the electron gives a precision of better than one part in a trillion (10^{−12}). This makes QED one of the most accurate physical theories constructed thus far.

Besides these independent measurements of the fine-structure constant, many other predictions of QED have been tested as well.

== Measurements of the fine-structure constant using different systems ==
Precision tests of QED have been performed in low-energy atomic physics experiments, high-energy collider experiments, and condensed matter systems. The value of α is obtained in each of these experiments by fitting an experimental measurement to a theoretical expression (including higher-order radiative corrections) that includes α as a parameter. The uncertainty in the extracted value of α includes both experimental and theoretical uncertainties. This program thus requires both high-precision measurements and high-precision theoretical calculations. Unless noted otherwise, all results below are taken from.

=== Low-energy measurements ===
==== Anomalous magnetic dipole moments ====
The most precise measurement of α comes from the anomalous magnetic dipole moment, or g−2 (pronounced "g minus 2"), of the electron. To make this measurement, two ingredients are needed:

1. A precise measurement of the anomalous magnetic dipole moment, and
2. A precise theoretical calculation of the anomalous magnetic dipole moment in terms of α.

As of February 2023, the best measurement of the anomalous magnetic dipole moment of the electron was made by the group of Gerald Gabrielse at Harvard University, using a single electron caught in a Penning trap. The difference between the electron's cyclotron frequency and its spin precession frequency in a magnetic field is proportional to g−2. An extremely high precision measurement of the quantized energies of the cyclotron orbits, or Landau levels, of the electron, compared to the quantized energies of the electron's two possible spin orientations, gives a value for the electron's spin g-factor:

g/2 = 1.00115965218059(13),

a precision of better than one part in a trillion. (The digits in parentheses indicate the standard uncertainty in the last listed digits of the measurement.)

The current state-of-the-art theoretical calculation of the anomalous magnetic dipole moment of the electron includes QED diagrams with up to four loops. Combining this with the experimental measurement of g yields the most precise value of α:

α^{−1} = 137.035999166(15),

a precision of better than a part in a billion. This uncertainty is ten times smaller than the nearest rival method involving atom-recoil measurements.

A value of α can also be extracted from the anomalous magnetic dipole moment of the muon. The g-factor of the muon is extracted using the same physical principle as for the electron above – namely, that the difference between the cyclotron frequency and the spin precession frequency in a magnetic field is proportional to g−2. The most precise measurement comes from Brookhaven National Laboratory's muon g−2 experiment, in which polarized muons are stored in a cyclotron and their spin orientation is measured by the direction of their decay electrons. As of February 2007, the current world average muon g-factor measurement is,

g/2 = 1.0011659208(6),

a precision of better than one part in a billion. The difference between the g-factors of the muon and the electron is due to their difference in mass. Because of the muon's larger mass, contributions to the theoretical calculation of its anomalous magnetic dipole moment from Standard Model weak interactions and from contributions involving hadrons are important at the current level of precision, whereas these effects are not important for the electron. The muon's anomalous magnetic dipole moment is also sensitive to contributions from new physics beyond the Standard Model, such as supersymmetry. For this reason, the muon's anomalous magnetic moment is normally used as a probe for new physics beyond the Standard Model rather than as a test of QED. See muon g–2 for current efforts to refine the measurement.

==== Atom-recoil measurements ====
This is an indirect method of measuring α, based on measurements of the masses of the electron, certain atoms, and the Rydberg constant. The Rydberg constant is known to seven parts in a trillion. The mass of the electron relative to that of caesium and rubidium atoms is also known with extremely high precision. If the mass of the electron can be measured with sufficiently high precision, then α can be found from the Rydberg constant according to

$$R_\infty = \frac{\alpha^2 m_\text{e} c}{4 \pi \hbar}.$$

To get the mass of the electron, this method actually measures the mass of an ^{87}Rb atom by measuring the recoil speed of the atom after it emits a photon of known wavelength in an atomic transition. Combining this with the ratio of electron to ^{87}Rb atom, the result for α is,

α^{−1} = 137.03599878(91).

Because this measurement is the next-most-precise after the measurement of α from the electron's anomalous magnetic dipole moment described above, their comparison provides the most stringent test of QED: the value of α obtained here is within one standard deviation of that found from the electron's anomalous magnetic dipole moment, an agreement to within ten parts in a billion.

==== Neutron Compton wavelength ====
This method of measuring α is very similar in principle to the atom-recoil method. In this case, the accurately known mass ratio of the electron to the neutron is used. The neutron mass is measured with high precision through a very precise measurement of its Compton wavelength. This is then combined with the value of the Rydberg constant to extract α. The result is,

α^{−1} = 137.0360101(54).

==== Hyperfine splitting ====
Hyperfine splitting is a splitting in the energy levels of an atom caused by the interaction between the magnetic moment of the nucleus and the combined spin and orbital magnetic moment of the electron. The hyperfine splitting in hydrogen, measured using Ramsey's hydrogen maser, is known with great precision. Unfortunately, the influence of the proton's internal structure limits how precisely the splitting can be predicted theoretically. This leads to the extracted value of α being dominated by theoretical uncertainty:

α^{−1} = 137.0360(3).

The hyperfine splitting in muonium, an "atom" consisting of an electron and an antimuon, provides a more precise measurement of α because the muon has no internal structure:

α^{−1} = 137.035994(18).

==== Lamb shift ====
The Lamb shift is a small difference in the energies of the 2 S_{1/2} and 2 P_{1/2} energy levels of hydrogen, which arises from a one-loop effect in quantum electrodynamics. The Lamb shift is proportional to α^{5} and its measurement yields the extracted value:

α^{−1} = 137.0368(7).

==== Positronium ====
Positronium is an "atom" consisting of an electron and a positron. Whereas the calculation of the energy levels of ordinary hydrogen is contaminated by theoretical uncertainties from the proton's internal structure, the particles that make up positronium have no internal structure so precise theoretical calculations can be performed. The measurement of the splitting between the 2 ^{3}S_{1} and the 1 ^{3}S_{1} energy levels of positronium yields

α^{−1} = 137.034(16).

Measurements of α can also be extracted from the positronium decay rate. Positronium decays through the annihilation of the electron and the positron into two or more gamma-ray photons. The decay rate of the singlet ("para-positronium") ^{1}S_{0} state yields

α^{−1} = 137.00(6),

and the decay rate of the triplet ("ortho-positronium") ^{3}S_{1} state yields

α^{−1} = 136.971(6).

This last result is the only serious discrepancy among the numbers given here, but there is some evidence that uncalculated higher-order quantum corrections give a large correction to the value quoted here.

=== High-energy QED processes ===
The cross sections of higher-order QED reactions at high-energy electron-positron colliders provide a determination of α. In order to compare the extracted value of α with the low-energy results, higher-order QED effects including the running of α due to vacuum polarization must be taken into account. These experiments typically achieve only percent-level accuracy, but their results are consistent with the precise measurements available at lower energies.

The cross section for e^{+} e^{−} → e^{+} e^{−} e^{+} e^{−} yields

α^{−1} = 136.5(2.7),

and the cross section for e^{+} e^{−} → e^{+} e^{−} μ^{+} μ^{−} yields

α^{−1} = 139.9(1.2).

=== Condensed matter systems ===
The quantum Hall effect and the AC Josephson effect are exotic quantum interference phenomena in condensed matter systems. These two effects provide a standard electrical resistance and a standard frequency, respectively, which measure the charge of the electron with corrections that are strictly zero for macroscopic systems.

The quantum Hall effect yields

α^{−1} = 137.0359979(32),

and the AC Josephson effect yields

α^{−1} = 137.0359770(77).

== Other tests ==
- QED predicts that the photon is a massless particle. A variety of highly sensitive tests have proven that the photon mass is either zero, or else extraordinarily small. One type of these tests, for example, works by checking Coulomb's law at high accuracy, as the photon's mass would be nonzero if Coulomb's law were modified. See Photon § Experimental checks on photon mass.
- QED predicts that when electrons get very close to each other, they behave as if they had a higher electric charge, due to vacuum polarization. This prediction was experimentally verified in 1997 using the TRISTAN particle accelerator in Japan.
- QED effects like vacuum polarization and self-energy influence the electrons bound to a nucleus in a heavy atom due to extreme electromagnetic fields. A recent experiment on the ground state hyperfine splitting in ^{209}Bi^{80+} and ^{209}Bi^{82+} ions revealed a deviation from the theory by more than 7 standard uncertainties. Indications show that this deviation may originate from a wrong value of the nuclear magnetic moment of ^{209}Bi.

== See also ==
- QED vacuum
- Eötvös experiment, another very high accuracy test, of gravitation
