= QED vacuum =

Lowest energy state in quantum electrodynamics

The QED vacuum or quantum electrodynamic vacuum is the field-theoretic vacuum of quantum electrodynamics. It is the lowest energy state (i.e., the ground state) of the electromagnetic field when the fields are quantized. When the Planck constant is hypothetically allowed to approach zero, QED vacuum is converted to classical vacuum; that is, the vacuum of classical electromagnetism.

Another field-theoretic vacuum is the QCD vacuum of the Standard Model.

A Feynman diagram (box diagram) for photon-photon scattering, where one photon scatters from the transient vacuum charge fluctuations of the other.

== Fluctuations ==
The QED vacuum is subject to fluctuations about a dormant zero average-field condition:

Video of an experiment showing vacuum fluctuations (red ring) amplified by spontaneous parametric down-conversion.

A description of the quantum vacuum is given by Joseph Silk in On the Shores of the Unknown (pg. 62):

The quantum theory asserts that a vacuum, even the most perfect vacuum devoid of any matter, is not really empty. Rather the quantum vacuum can be depicted as a sea of continuously appearing and disappearing [pairs of] particles that manifest themselves in the apparent jostling of particles that is quite distinct from their thermal motions. These particles are ‘virtual’, as opposed to real, particles. ...At any given instant, the vacuum is full of such virtual pairs, which leave their signature behind, by affecting the energy levels of atoms.

=== Virtual particles ===
An intuitive picture of virtual particles can be attempted based upon the Heisenberg energy-time uncertainty principle
$$\Delta E \Delta t \ge \frac{\hbar}{2},$$
where ΔE and Δt are the uncertainties in energy and time, respectively, with ħ the Planck constant divided by 2π. Using this starting point, it could be argued that the short lifetime of virtual particles allows the "borrowing" of large energies from the vacuum, thus permitting particle generation over short time intervals.

This interpretation of the energy-time uncertainty relation is not universally accepted, however. One issue is the use of an uncertainty relation limiting measurement accuracy as though a time uncertainty Δt determines a "budget" for borrowing energy ΔE. Another issue is the meaning of "time" in this relation, because energy and time (unlike position q and momentum p, for example) do not satisfy a canonical commutation relation (such as [q, p] = iħ). Various schemes have been advanced to construct an observable that has some kind of time interpretation while also satisfying a canonical commutation relation with energy. The many approaches to the energy-time uncertainty principle are a continuing subject of study.

=== Quantization of the fields ===
The Heisenberg uncertainty principle does not allow a particle to exist in a state in which the particle is simultaneously at a fixed location and has also zero momentum. Instead, the particle has a range of momenta, the distribution of which is attributable to quantum fluctuations; if confined, it has a zero-point energy.

An uncertainty principle applies to all quantum mechanical operators that do not commute. In particular, it applies also to the electromagnetic field; in order to understand this, it is necessary to elucidate the role of commutators for this field.

The standard approach to the quantization of the electromagnetic field begins by introducing a vector potential A and a scalar potential V to represent the electric field E and magnetic field B using the relations
$$\begin{align}
\mathbf B &= \mathbf {\nabla  \times A}; \\
\mathbf E &= -\frac{\partial}{\partial t} \mathbf{A} - \mathbf{\nabla}V .
\end{align}$$
The vector potential is not completely determined by these relations, leaving open a so-called gauge freedom. Resolving this ambiguity using the Coulomb gauge leads to a description of the electromagnetic fields in the absence of charges in terms of the vector potential and the momentum field Π, given by
$$\mathbf \Pi = \varepsilon_0 \frac{ \partial }{\partial t} \mathbf A,$$
where ε_{0} is the electric constant in SI units. Quantization is achieved by insisting that the momentum field and the vector potential do not commute. That is, the equal-time commutator is
$$\bigl[\Pi_i(\mathbf{r}, t),\ A_j(\mathbf{r}', t)\bigr] = -i\hbar \delta_{ij}\delta (\mathbf{r}-\mathbf{r}'),$$
where r, r′ are spatial locations, ħ is the reduced Planck constant, δ_{ij} is the Kronecker delta, and δ(r − r′) is the Dirac delta function. The notation [ , ] represents the commutator.

Quantization can be achieved without introducing the vector potential in terms of the underlying fields themselves:
$$\left[ \hat{ E}_k (\boldsymbol r ) , \hat{ B}_{k'} (\boldsymbol r') \right] = -\varepsilon_{kk'm}\frac{i \hbar}{\varepsilon_0} \frac {\partial}{\partial x_m}  \delta (\boldsymbol{r-r'}),$$
where the circumflex denotes a Schrödinger time-independent field operator, and ε_{ijk} is the antisymmetric Levi-Civita tensor.

Because of the non-commutation of field variables, the variances of the fields cannot be zero, although their averages are zero. So, the electromagnetic field has a zero-point energy, and therefore a lowest quantum state. The interaction of an excited atom with this lowest quantum state of the electromagnetic field is what leads to spontaneous emission: The transition of an excited atom to a state of lower energy by emission of a photon even when no external perturbation of the atom is present.

== Electromagnetic properties ==
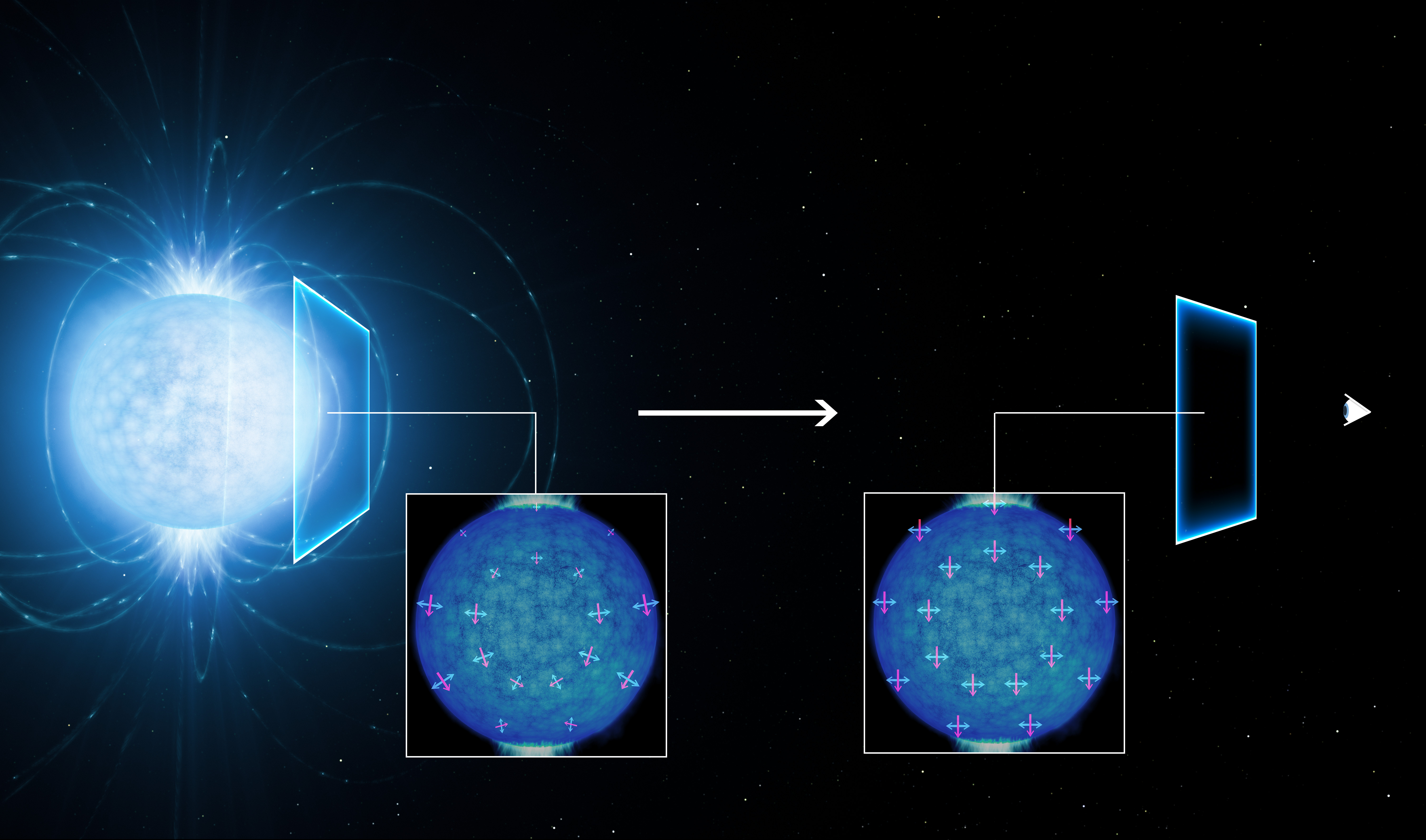
The polarization of observed light in an extremely strong magnetic field suggests that the empty space around the neutron star RX J1856.5−3754 is subject to vacuum birefringence.

As a result of quantization, the quantum electrodynamic vacuum can be considered a material medium. It is capable of vacuum polarization. In particular, the force law between charged particles is affected. The electrical permittivity of the quantum electrodynamic vacuum can be calculated, and it differs slightly from the simple ε_{0} of the classical vacuum. (Likewise, its permeability can also be calculated and differs slightly from μ_{0}.) This medium is a dielectric with relative dielectric constant greater than 1, and is diamagnetic, with relative magnetic permeability less than 1. In extreme conditions in which the field exceeds the Schwinger limit (e.g., in the exterior regions of pulsars), the quantum electrodynamic vacuum is thought to exhibit nonlinearity in the fields. Calculations also indicate birefringence and dichroism in the presence of strong fields. Many electromagnetic effects of the vacuum are difficult to detect, and only recently have experiments been designed to enable the observation of nonlinear effects. To this end, PVLAS and other teams are working towards the needed sensitivity to detect quantum electrodynamic nonlinearity.

== Attainability ==
A perfect vacuum is itself only attainable in principle. It is an idealization, similar to absolute zero for temperature, that can be approached, but never actually realized. This idea is summarized by Luciano Boi in Creating the physical world ex nihilo? (pg. 55):

One reason [a vacuum is not empty] is that the walls of a vacuum chamber emit light in the form of black-body radiation...If this soup of photons is in thermodynamic equilibrium with the walls, it can be said to have a particular temperature, as well as a pressure. Another reason that perfect vacuum is impossible is the Heisenberg uncertainty principle which states that no particles can ever have an exact position ...Each atom exists as a probability function of space, which has a certain nonzero value everywhere in a given volume. ...More fundamentally, quantum mechanics predicts ...a correction to the energy called the zero-point energy [that] consists of energies of virtual particles that have a brief existence. This is called vacuum fluctuation.

Virtual particles make a perfect vacuum unrealizable, but leave open the question of attainability of a quantum electrodynamic vacuum, or QED vacuum. Predictions of QED vacuum such as spontaneous emission, the Casimir effect, and the Lamb shift have been experimentally verified, suggesting QED vacuum is a good model for a near-perfect realizable vacuum. There are competing theoretical models for vacuum, however. For example, quantum chromodynamic vacuum includes many virtual particles not treated in quantum electrodynamics. The vacuum of quantum gravity treats gravitational effects not included in the Standard Model. It remains an open question whether further refinements in experimental technique will ultimately support another model for a realizable vacuum.

== See also ==
- Feynman diagram
- History of quantum field theory
- Precision tests of QED
