= Lamb shift =

Effect in quantum electrodynamics

Fine structure of energy levels in hydrogen – relativistic corrections to the Bohr model

In physics, the Lamb shift, named after Willis Lamb, is an anomalous difference in energy between two electron orbitals in a hydrogen atom. The difference was not predicted by theory and it cannot be derived from the Dirac equation, which predicts identical energies. Hence the Lamb shift is a deviation from theory seen in the differing energies contained by the ^{2}S_{1/2} and ^{2}P_{1/2} orbitals of the hydrogen atom.

The Lamb shift is caused by interactions between the virtual photons created through vacuum energy fluctuations and the electron as it moves around the hydrogen nucleus in each of these two orbitals. The Lamb shift has since played a significant role through vacuum energy fluctuations in theoretical prediction of Hawking radiation from black holes.

== Early experimental observations ==
In the early 1930s, several experimental groups observed discrepancies in the fine structure of hydrogen that hinted at what would later be called the Lamb shift, though these findings were initially controversial and not widely accepted.

In 1933, William V. Houston and Yu-Ming Hsieh at the California Institute of Technology conducted experiments examining the fine structure of the Balmer lines of hydrogen. They found that the measured line separations were "far too small to agree with the ordinary theory" based on the Dirac equation, with discrepancies of approximately 3%. Houston and Hsieh concluded that "the discrepancy may lie in the neglect of the radiation reaction in the calculation of the energy levels" an early suggestion of what would later be understood as the self-energy correction underlying the Lamb shift. Their work was inspired by remarks from J. Robert Oppenheimer and Niels Bohr concerning theoretical gaps in understanding radiation field effects.

Two weeks after Houston and Hsieh's publication, R. C. Gibbs and Robley Williams at Cornell University published similar findings. They identified that the discrepancy was specifically associated with a shift in the ^{2}S_{1/2} energy level, though Gibbs was not theoretically minded and hesitated to explain the physical origin of the shift.

The experimental findings generated controversy within the spectroscopy community. Some experimenters, including Frank Spedding, C. D. Shane, and Norman Grace at Caltech, initially reported similar discrepancies but later retracted their results in 1935, citing concerns about experimental methodology and statistical analysis. The small magnitude of the effect and the technical challenges of the measurements contributed to uncertainty about whether the observations were real or artifacts.

The phenomenon was theorized by Simon Pasternack in 1938, who had discussed the experimental results with Houston at Caltech and reached conclusions similar to those of Gibbs and Williams regarding the ^{2}S_{1/2} level. Thus the phenomenon became known as the Pasternack effect before its experimental confirmation. However, the early experimental work of Houston, Hsieh, Gibbs, and Williams received little attention for more than a decade and the theoretical implications were not fully developed at the time. The historical significance of these early observations, particularly the pioneering work of Houston and Hsieh, was not widely recognized until historians of science reexamined the experimental record in the 1980s and later.

This effect was precisely measured in 1947 in the Lamb–Retherford experiment on the hydrogen microwave spectrum and this measurement provided the stimulus for renormalization theory to handle the divergences. The calculation of the Lamb shift by Hans Bethe in 1947 revolutionized quantum electrodynamics. The effect was the harbinger of modern quantum electrodynamics later developed by Julian Schwinger, Richard Feynman, Ernst Stueckelberg, Sin-Itiro Tomonaga and Freeman Dyson. Lamb won the Nobel Prize in Physics in 1955 for his discoveries related to the Lamb shift. Victor Weisskopf regretted that his insecurity about his mathematical abilities may have cost him a Nobel Prize when he did not publish results (which turned out to be correct) about what is now known as the Lamb shift.

In 1978, on Lamb's 65th birthday, Freeman Dyson addressed him as follows: "Those years, when the Lamb shift was the central theme of physics, were golden years for all the physicists of my generation. You were the first to see that this tiny shift, so elusive and hard to measure, would clarify our thinking about particles and fields."

== Derivation ==
This heuristic derivation of the electrodynamic level shift follows Theodore A. Welton's approach.

The fluctuations in the electric and magnetic fields associated with the QED vacuum perturbs the electric potential due to the atomic nucleus. This perturbation causes a fluctuation in the position of the electron, which explains the energy shift. The difference of potential energy is given by

$$\Delta V = V(\vec{r}+\delta \vec{r})-V(\vec{r})=\delta \vec{r} \cdot \nabla V (\vec{r}) + \frac{1}{2} (\delta \vec{r} \cdot \nabla)^2V(\vec{r})+\cdots$$

Since the fluctuations are isotropic,

$$\langle \delta \vec{r} \rangle _{\rm vac} =0,$$
$$\langle (\delta \vec{r} \cdot \nabla )^2 \rangle _{\rm vac} = \frac{1}{3} \langle (\delta \vec{r})^2\rangle _{\rm vac} \nabla ^2.$$

So one can obtain

$$\langle \Delta V\rangle =\frac{1}{6} \langle (\delta \vec{r})^2\rangle _{\rm vac}\left\langle \nabla ^2\left(\frac{-e^2}{4\pi \epsilon _0r}\right)\right\rangle _{\rm at}.$$

The classical equation of motion for the electron displacement (δr)_{k→} induced by a single mode of the field of wave vector k→ and frequency ν is

$$m\frac{d^2}{dt^2} (\delta r)_{\vec{k}}=-eE_{\vec{k}},$$

and this is valid only when the frequency ν is greater than ν_{0} in the Bohr orbit, $\nu > \pi c/a_0$. The electron is unable to respond to the fluctuating field if the fluctuations are smaller than the natural orbital frequency in the atom.

For the field oscillating at ν,

$$\delta r(t)\cong \delta r(0)(e^{-i\nu t}+e^{i\nu t}),$$

therefore

$$(\delta r)_{\vec{k}} \cong \frac{e}{mc^2k^2} E_{\vec{k}}=\frac{e}{mc^2k^2} \mathcal{E} _{\vec{k}} \left (a_{\vec{k}}e^{-i\nu t+i\vec{k}\cdot \vec{r}}+h.c. \right) \qquad \text{with} \qquad  \mathcal{E} _{\vec{k}}=\left(\frac{\hbar ck/2}{\epsilon _0 \Omega}\right)^{1/2},$$

where $\Omega$ is some large normalization volume (the volume of the hypothetical "box" containing the hydrogen atom), and $h.c.$ denotes the hermitian conjugate of the preceding term. By the summation over all $\vec{k},$

$$\begin{align}
\langle (\delta \vec{r} )^2\rangle _{\rm vac} &=\sum_{\vec{k}} \left(\frac{e}{mc^2k^2} \right)^2 \left\langle 0\left |(E_{\vec{k}})^2 \right |0 \right \rangle \\
&=\sum_{\vec{k}} \left(\frac{e}{mc^2k^2} \right)^2\left(\frac{\hbar ck}{2\epsilon _0 \Omega} \right) \\
&=2\frac{\Omega}{(2\pi )^3}4\pi \int dkk^2\left(\frac{e}{mc^2k^2} \right)^2\left(\frac{\hbar ck}{2\epsilon_0 \Omega}\right) && \text{since continuity of } \vec{k} \text{ implies } \sum_{\vec{k}} \to 2 \frac{\Omega}{(2\pi)^3} \int d^3 k \\
&=\frac{1}{2\epsilon_0\pi^2}\left(\frac{e^2}{\hbar c}\right)\left(\frac{\hbar}{mc}\right)^2\int \frac{dk}{k}
\end{align}$$

This integral diverges as the wave number approaches zero or infinity. As mentioned above, this method is expected to be valid only when $\nu > \pi c/a_0$, or equivalently $k > \pi/a_0$. It is also valid only for wavelengths longer than the Compton wavelength, or equivalently $k < mc/\hbar$. Therefore, one can choose the upper and lower limit of the integral and these limits make the result converge.

$$\langle(\delta\vec{r})^2\rangle_{\rm vac}\cong\frac{1}{2\epsilon_0\pi^2}\left(\frac{e^2}{\hbar c}\right)\left(\frac{\hbar}{mc}\right)^2\ln\frac{4\epsilon_0\hbar c}{e^2}$$.

For the atomic orbital and the Coulomb potential,

$$\left\langle\nabla^2\left(\frac{-e^2}{4\pi\epsilon_0r}\right)\right\rangle_{\rm at}=\frac{-e^2}{4\pi\epsilon_0}\int d\vec{r}\psi^*(\vec{r})\nabla^2\left(\frac{1}{r}\right)\psi(\vec{r})=\frac{e^2}{\epsilon_0}|\psi(0)|^2,$$

since it is known that

$$\nabla^2\left(\frac{1}{r}\right)=-4\pi\delta(\vec{r}).$$

For p orbitals, the nonrelativistic wave function vanishes at the origin (at the nucleus), so there is no energy shift. But for s orbitals there is some finite value at the origin,

$$\psi_{2S}(0)=\frac{1}{(8\pi a_0^3)^{1/2}},$$

where the Bohr radius is

$$a_0=\frac{4\pi\epsilon_0\hbar^2}{me^2}.$$

Therefore,

$$\left\langle\nabla^2\left(\frac{-e^2}{4\pi\epsilon_0r}\right)\right\rangle_{\rm at}=\frac{e^2}{\epsilon_0}|\psi_{2S}(0)|^2=\frac{e^2}{8\pi\epsilon_0a_0^3}$$.

Finally, the difference of the potential energy becomes:

$$\langle\Delta V\rangle=\frac{4}{3}\frac{e^2}{4\pi\epsilon_0}\frac{e^2}{4\pi\epsilon_0\hbar c}\left(\frac{\hbar}{mc}\right)^2\frac{1}{8\pi a_0^3}\ln\frac{4\epsilon_0\hbar c}{e^2} = \alpha^5 mc^2 \frac{1}{6\pi} \ln\frac{1}{\pi\alpha},$$

where $\alpha$ is the fine-structure constant. This shift is about 500 MHz, within an order of magnitude of the observed shift of 1057 MHz. This is equal to an energy of only 7.00×10^{−25} J (4.37×10^{−6} eV).

Welton's heuristic derivation of the Lamb shift is similar to, but distinct from, the calculation of the Darwin term using Zitterbewegung, a contribution to the fine structure that is of lower order in $\alpha$ than the Lamb shift.

== Lamb–Retherford experiment ==
In 1947 Willis Lamb and Robert Retherford carried out an experiment using microwave techniques to stimulate radio-frequency transitions between ^{2}S_{1/2} and ^{2}P_{1/2} levels of hydrogen. By using lower frequencies than for optical transitions the Doppler broadening could be neglected (Doppler broadening is proportional to the frequency). The energy difference Lamb and Retherford found was a rise of about 1000 MHz (0.03 cm^{−1}) of the ^{2}S_{1/2} level above the ^{2}P_{1/2} level.

This particular difference is a one-loop effect of quantum electrodynamics, and can be interpreted as the influence of virtual photons that have been emitted and re-absorbed by the atom. In quantum electrodynamics the electromagnetic field is quantized and, like the harmonic oscillator in quantum mechanics, its lowest state is not zero. Thus, there exist small zero-point oscillations that cause the electron to execute rapid oscillatory motions. The electron is "smeared out" and each radius value is changed from r to r + δr (a small but finite perturbation).

The Coulomb potential is therefore perturbed by a small amount and the degeneracy of the two energy levels is removed. The new potential can be approximated (using atomic units) as follows:

$$\langle E_\mathrm{pot} \rangle=-\frac{Ze^2}{4\pi\epsilon_0}\left\langle\frac{1}{r+\delta r}\right\rangle.$$

The Lamb shift itself is given by

$$\Delta E_\mathrm{Lamb}=\alpha^5 m_e c^2 \frac{k(n,0)}{4n^3}\ \mathrm{for}\ \ell=0\,$$

with k(n, 0) around 13 varying slightly with n, and

$$\Delta E_\mathrm{Lamb}=\alpha^5 m_e c^2 \frac{1}{4n^3}\left[k(n,\ell)\pm \frac{1}{\pi(j+\frac{1}{2})(\ell+\frac{1}{2})}\right]\ \mathrm{for}\ \ell\ne 0\ \mathrm{and}\ j=\ell\pm\frac{1}{2},$$

with log(k(n,ℓ)) a small number (approx. −0.05) making k(n,ℓ) close to unity.

For a derivation of ΔE_{Lamb} see for example:

== In the hydrogen spectrum ==
In 1947, Hans Bethe was the first to explain the Lamb shift in the hydrogen spectrum, and he thus laid the foundation for the modern development of quantum electrodynamics. Bethe was able to derive the Lamb shift by implementing the idea of mass renormalization, which allowed him to calculate the observed energy shift as the difference between the shift of a bound electron and the shift of a free electron. The Lamb shift currently provides a measurement of the fine-structure constant α to better than one part in a million, allowing a precision test of quantum electrodynamics.

His calculation of the Lamb shift has been stated to have revolutionized quantum electrodynamics and having "opened the way to the modern era of particle physics".

== See also ==
- Uehling potential, first approximation to the Lamb shift
- Shelter Island Conference
- Zeeman effect used to measure the Lamb shift
