= Tavis–Cummings model =

Quantum optical theoretical system

In quantum optics, the Tavis–Cummings model is a theoretical model to describe an ensemble of identical two-level atoms coupled symmetrically to a single-mode quantized bosonic field. The model extends the Jaynes–Cummings model to larger spin numbers that represent collections of multiple atoms. It differs from the Dicke model in its use of the rotating-wave approximation to conserve the number of excitations of the system.

Originally introduced by Michael Tavis and Fred Cummings in 1968 to unify representations of atomic gases in electromagnetic fields under a single fully quantum Hamiltonian — as Robert Dicke had done previously using perturbation theory — the Tavis–Cummings model's restriction to a single field-mode with negligible counterrotating interactions simplifies the system's mathematics while preserving the breadth of its dynamics.

The model demonstrates superradiance, bright and dark states, Rabi oscillations and spontaneous emission, and other features of interest in quantum electrodynamics, quantum control and computation, atomic and molecular physics, and many-body physics. The model has been experimentally tested to determine the conditions of its viability, and realized in semiconducting and superconducting qubits.

== Hamiltonian ==
The Tavis–Cummings model assumes that for the purposes of electromagnetic interactions, atomic structures are dominated by their dipole, as they are for distant neutral atoms in the weak-field limit. Thus the only atomic quantity under consideration is its angular momentum, not its position nor fine electronic structure. Furthermore, the model asserts the atoms to be sufficiently distant that they don't interact with each-other, only with the electromagnetic field, modeled as a bosonic field (since photons are the gauge bosons of electromagnetism).

=== Formal derivation ===
For two atomic-electronic states separated by a Bohr frequency $\omega_{eg}$, then transitions between the ground- and excited-states $|g\rangle$ and $|e\rangle$ are mediated by Pauli operators: $\hat{\sigma}_z=|e\rangle\langle e|-|g\rangle\langle g|$, $\hat{\sigma}_{+}=|e\rangle\langle g|$, and $\hat{\sigma}_{-}=|g\rangle\langle e|$, and the Hamiltonian separating these energy states in the $j$th atom is $\hat{H}_A^{(j)}=\frac{\hbar \omega_{eg}}{2}\hat{\sigma}_z^{(j)}$. With $N$ independent atoms each subject to this energy gap, the total atomic Hamiltonian is thus $\hat{H}_A=\sum_{j=1}^{N}\hat{H}_A^{(j)}=\omega_{eg}\hat{S}_z$ with total spin operators $\hat{S}_{\alpha}=\frac{\hbar}{2}\sum_{j=1}^{N}\hat{\sigma}_{\alpha}^{(j)}$.

Similarly, in a free field with no modal restrictions, creation and annihilation operators dictate the presence of photons in each mode: $\hat{H}_{F}=\sum_{\vec{k},\mu}\hbar\omega_{k}\hat{a}_{\vec{k},\mu}^\dagger \hat{a}_{\vec{k},\mu}$ with wave number $\vec{k}$, polarization $\mu$, and frequency $\omega_k=c^{-1}|\vec{k}|$. If the dynamics occur within a sufficiently small cavity, only one mode (the cavity's resonant mode) will couple to the atom, thus the field Hamiltonian simplifies to $\hat{H}_{F}=\hbar\omega_c\hat{a}^\dagger\hat{a}$, just as in the Jaynes-Cummings and Dicke models.

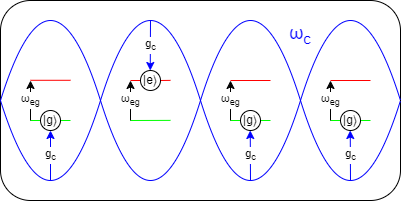
Schematic diagram of the Tavis–Cummings physical model, representing an ensemble of two-level atoms (four dots on red and green levels) interacting symmetrically with a single mode photonic field (blue standing wave), isolated within a cavity. The atomic level separation is $\omega_{eg}$, the cavity's resonant frequency is $\omega_c$, and the coupling strength of atom-field interactions is $g_c$.

Finally, interactions between atoms and the field is determined by the atomic dipole, rendered quantumly as an operator $\hat{\vec{d}}$, and the similarly expressed electric field at the atoms' centers (assuming the field is the same at each atom's position) $\hat{\vec{E}}$, thus $\hat{H}_{AF}=-\sum_{j=1}^N\hat{\vec{d}}^{(j)}\cdot\hat{\vec{E}}^{(j)}$ which acts on both the qubit and bosonic degrees of freedom. The dipole operator couples the excited and ground states of each atom $\hat{\vec{d}}^{(j)}=\vec{d}_{eg}\hat{\sigma}_{+}^{(j)}+\vec{d}_{eg}^*\hat{\sigma}_{-}^{(j)}$, while the electric free field solution is:

$\hat{\vec{E}}[\vec{R},t]=\sum_{\vec{k},\mu} E_{k} \vec{\epsilon}_{\vec{k},\mu} e^{i(\vec{k}\cdot\vec{R}-\omega_{k} t)} \hat{a}_{\vec{k},\mu}+ E_{k}\vec{\epsilon}_{\vec{k},\mu}e^{-i(\vec{k}\cdot\vec{R}-\omega_{k} t)}\hat{a}_{\vec{k},\mu}^\dagger$, which at a static point evaluates as:

$\hat{\vec{E}}=\sum_{\vec{k},\mu} \sqrt{2\pi\hbar\omega_k}(e^{-i\omega_k t}\vec{u}_{\vec{k},\mu}\hat{a}_{\vec{k},\mu}+ e^{i\omega_k t} \vec{u}_{\vec{k},\mu}^* \hat{a}_{\vec{k},\mu}^\dagger)$, thus the interaction Hamiltonian expands as

$\hat{H}_{AF}=\sum_{\vec{k},\mu}(e^{-i\omega_k t}g_{\vec{k},\mu}\hat{a}_{\vec{k},\mu}+e^{i\omega_k t}g_{\vec{k},\mu}^*\hat{a}_{\vec{k},\mu} ^\dagger)(\hat{S}_{+}+\hat{S}_{-})$.

Here, $g_{\vec{k},\mu}\equiv-\sqrt{2\pi\hbar\omega_k N }\vec{d}_{eg}\cdot\vec{u}_{\vec{k},\mu}$ specifies the coupling strength of the total dipole to each electric field mode, and functioning as a Rabi frequency that scales with ensemble size $g_c\propto\sqrt{N}$ due to the Pythagorean addition of single-atom dipoles. Then, in the rotating frame, $\hat{H}_{AF}=\sum_{\vec{k},\mu}(e^{-i\omega_k t}g_{\vec{k},\mu}\hat{a}_{\vec{k},\mu}+e^{i\omega_k t}g_{\vec{k},\mu}^*\hat{a}_{\vec{k},\mu} ^\dagger)(e^{i\omega_{eg}t}\hat{S}_{+}+e^{-i\omega_{eg}t}\hat{S}_{-})$, which results in corotating terms $\hat{a}_{\vec{k},\mu}\hat{S}_{+}$ (representing photon absorption causing atomic excitation), $\hat{a}_{\vec{k},\mu}^\dagger \hat{S}_{-}$ (representing spontaneous emission), and counterrotating terms $\hat{a}_{\vec{k},\mu} \hat{S}_{-}$ and $\hat{a}_{\vec{k},\mu}^\dagger \hat{S}_{+}$ (representing second-order effects like self-interaction and Lamb shifts). When $\omega_k\approx \omega_{eg}$ and $g_{\vec{k},\mu}\ll \omega_k$ (close to resonance in a weak field), the corotating terms accumulate phase very slowly, while the counterrotating terms accumulate phase too fast to significantly affect time-ordered integrals, thus the rotating wave approximation allows counterrotating terms to drop in the rotating frame. The cavity permits only one field mode with energy sufficiently close to the Bohr energy, $\omega_k=\omega_c\approx \omega_{eg}$, so the final form of the interaction Hamiltonian is $\hat{H}_{AF}=g_c e^{-i\Delta t}\hat{a}\hat{S}_{+}+g_c^* e^{i\Delta t}\hat{a}^\dagger \hat{S}_{-}$ for dephasing $\Delta=\omega_c-\omega_{eg}$.

In total, the Tavis–Cummings Hamiltonian includes the atomic and photonic self-energies and the atom-field interaction:

$\hat{H}_{TC}=\hat{H}_{A}+\hat{H}_{F}+\hat{H}_{AF}$,

$\hat{H}_{A}=\omega_{eg}\hat{S}_z$,

$\hat{H}_{F}=\hbar\omega_c\hat{a}^\dagger \hat{a}$,

$\hat{H}_{AF}=g_c e^{-i\Delta t}\hat{a}\hat{S}_{+}+g_c^* e^{i\Delta t}\hat{a}^\dagger \hat{S}_{-}$.

=== Symmetries ===
The Tavis–Cummings model as described above exhibits two symmetries arising from the Hamiltonian's commutation with excitation number $\hat{M}=\hat{S}_z+\hbar \hat{a}^\dagger \hat{a}$ and angular momentum magnitude $\hat{S}^2=\hat{S}_x^2+\hat{S}_y^2+\hat{S}_z^2$. Since $[\hat{M},\hat{H}_{TC}] =0= [\hat{S}^2,\hat{H}_{TC}]$, it is possible to find simultaneous eigenstates $|s,m,j\rangle$ such that:

$\hat{H}_{TC}|s,m,j\rangle=E_{s,m,j} |s,m,j\rangle$,

$\hat{S}^2|s,m,j\rangle=\hbar^2 s(s+1)|s,m,j \rangle$,

$\hat{M}|s,m,j\rangle=\hbar(m-s)|s,m,j\rangle$.

The quantum number $s$ is bounded by $0\leq s\leq\frac{N}{2}$, and $m\geq 0$, but due to the infinity of Fock space, excitation number is unbounded above, unlike angular momentum projection quantum numbers. Just as the Jaynes-Cummings Hamiltonian block-diagonalizes into infinite $2\times2$ blocks of constant excitation number, the Tavis–Cummings Hamiltonian block-diagonlizes into infinite blocks of size up to $2^{N}\times2^{N}$ with constant $m-s$, and within these larger blocks, further block-diagonalizes into (usually degenerate) blocks of size $J+1\times J+1$ where $J\equiv \min(2s,m)$, with constant cooperation number $s$. The size of each of these smallest blocks (irreps of SU(2)) determine the bounds of the final quantum number that specifies the eigenenergy: $0\leq j\leq J$, with $j=0$ signifying the ground state of each irrep, and $j=J$ the maximally excited state.

== Dynamics ==
Under the simplifications of real $g_c$ and quasistatically small $\Delta$, the Hamiltonian becomes $\hat{H}_{TC}=\omega_{eg}\hat{S}_z+\hbar\omega_c\hat{a}^\dagger\hat{a}+g_c(\hat{a}^\dagger \hat{S}_{-}+\hat{a}\hat{S}_{+})$, whose matrix elements one can express in a joint Dicke and Fock basis $|s,s_z\rangle\otimes |n\rangle$ such that $\hat{S}_{z}|s,s_z \rangle=\hbar s_z|s,s_z \rangle$ and $\hat{a}^\dagger \hat{a}|n \rangle =n|n \rangle$. Necessarily, $m=s+s_z+n$, so the matrix elements are as follows:

$\langle s,s_z,n|\hat{H}_{TC}|s,s_z,n\rangle= \hbar (\omega_{eg} s_{z} + \omega_{c} n)=\hbar(\omega_c(m-s)-\Delta s_z)$
$$\begin{align}
\langle s,s_z,n|\hat{H}_{TC}|s,s_z+1,n-1 \rangle&=\langle s,s_z+1,n-1|\hat{H}_{TC}|s,s_z,n\rangle\\
&=\hbar g_c \sqrt{n(s+s_z+1)(s-s_z)}\\
\end{align}$$
$\langle s,s_z,n|\hat{H}_{TC}|s',s_z',n'\rangle=0$ if $s\neq s'$, $s_z+n\neq s_z'+n'$, or $|s_z-s_z'|>1$.

From these elements, one can express Schrödinger equations of motion to demonstrate the photon field's ability to mediate entanglement formation between atoms without atom-atom interactions:

$$\begin{align}
{d\over dt}|s,s_z,n\rangle=&{}-i(\omega_c(m-s)-\Delta s_z)|s,s_z,n\rangle\\
&{}-ig_c\sqrt{n(s+s_z +1)(s-s_z)}|s,s_z+1,n-1\rangle\\
&{}-ig_c\sqrt{(n+1)(s+s_z)(s-s_{z}+1)}|s,s_z-1,n+1\rangle,\end{align}$$

for which the fine-tuned, multivariate dependence on quantum numbers demonstrates the difficulty of solving the Tavis-Cumming model's eigensystem. Here, a few approximate methods, and an exact solution involving Stark shifts and Kerr nonlinearities follow.

=== Spectrum approximations ===
In 1969, Tavis and Cummings found approximate eigenenergies and eigenstates for a nondimensionalized Hamiltonian in three different regimes of approximation: first, for $j\ll J$ near the ground-state of each irrep; second, for $m \gtrsim 2s$ and $m-s\gg 1$ when each atom sees a highly saturated "averaged" field; third, for $m\ll s$ with sparse excitations. In all solutions, eigenstates are related to Dicke-Fock joint states by $|s,m,j\rangle=\sum_{n=\max(0,m-2s)}^{m} A_{s,m,j}^{(n)}|s,s_z=m-s-n\rangle\otimes |n\rangle$, for coefficients $A_{s,m,j}^{(n)}$ that are solved from the Hamiltonian spectrum.

For $j$ close to zero, a differential approach provides the eigenvalues: $E_{s,m,j} \approx -\sqrt{\alpha} (j+\frac{1}{2})+\sqrt{(j+\frac{1}{2})^2\alpha+n_{0} C_{m-s-n_{0}}^2}$ with $\alpha=\sqrt{3s(s+1)+(m-s)(m-s+1)+1}$, average photon number $n_0=\frac{1}{3}(2m-2s+\alpha+1)$, and differential coefficient $C_{x}=\sqrt{s(s+1)-x(x+1)}$.

For an averaged photon field when $m\gtrsim 2s$ in a large photon-rich system, the off-diagonal matrix elements in $\hat{H}_{TC}$ (above) replace $n$ with $n_0$, and each two-level atom interacts independently with a photon field that conveys no information about the other atoms. For each of these atoms, there are two dressed eigenstates coupled to "pseudophoton" number states: $|\pm\rangle=\frac{1}{\sqrt{2}}(|\uparrow\rangle|\otimes|\frac{m-s}{N}-\frac{1}{2}\rangle\pm |\downarrow\rangle|\otimes|\frac{m-s}{N}+\frac{1}{2}\rangle)$, with single-atom eigenenergies $\lambda_{\pm}\approx\frac{m-s}{N}\pm g_c\sqrt{n_0}$. Superpositions of these single-atom dressed states construct the full eigenstates $|s,m,j\rangle$ according to addition of angular momenta, mediated by Clebsch-Gordan coefficients. The full eigenvalues are approximately $E_{s,m,j}\approx m-s-2(s-j)g_c\sqrt{n_0}$.

For $m<s$ when the atomic ensemble, and not the photon field, is averaged, then the off-diagonal elements in $\hat{H}_{TC}$ approximate as $g_c\sqrt{2ns (m-n+1)}$, smearing over the atomic degrees of freedom in $s_z$. Eigenstates are constructed as weighted superpositions of photon number states coupled to a spin state, but the eigenvalues are now$E_{s,m,j}\approx m-s-(m-2j)g_c \sqrt{2s}$.

=== Bethe ansatz ===
In 1996, Nikolay Bogoliubov (son of the 1992 Dirac Medalist of the same name), Robin Bullough, and Jussi Timonen found that adding quadratic excitation-dependent terms to the Tavis–Cummings Hamiltonian allowed for an exact analytic eigensystem. In the limit where these Kerr and Stark shifts vanish, this solution can recover the eigensystem of the unmodified Tavis–Cummings system.

Including a Kerr term of the form $\hat{a}^{\dagger} \hat{a}^{\dagger} \hat{a} \hat{a}$, or a Stark term $\hat{S}_z^2$ equivalently results in a new Hamiltonian: $\hat{H}_{TC2}=\hat{H}_{TC}+\hbar\gamma \hat{a}^{\dagger} \hat{a}^{\dagger} \hat{a} \hat{a}+ \frac{\gamma}{\hbar} \hat{S}_{z}^{2}$, which obeys the same operator symmetries (above) as does the unmodified Tavis–Cummings Hamiltonian, and which reduces to Tavis–Cummings in the limit $\gamma\to 0$. Thus the transformation $\hat{H}_0=\frac{1}{g_c}(\hat{H}_{TC2}+(\gamma-\omega_c)\hat{M}+\frac{\gamma}{\hbar}\hat{M}^2)$ preserves the dynamics and shares joint eigenvectors with the untransformed Hamiltonian. The transformed Hamiltonian, explicitly, is $\hat{H}_0=d\hat{S}_z+\hat{a}^\dagger \hat{S}_{-}+\hat{a}\hat{S}_{+}+c \hat{a}^\dagger\hat{a}\hat{S}_z$ for new parameters $c=-2 \frac{\gamma}{g_c}$ and $d=\frac{\gamma-\Delta}{g_c}$, which is integrable using quantum inverse methods. Separating the dynamics into two $2\times2$ complex-parametrized operator matrices (that is, matrices whose elements are operators), one acting on the bosonic degrees of freedom and the other on the spin degrees of freedom produces a monodromy matrix whose determinant is directly proportional to $\hat{S}^2$, whose trace is proportional to $\hat{H}_0$, and whose trace's parametric derivative is proportional to $\hat{M}$. Manipulating the monodromy matrix allows its spectral parameter to determine the Hamiltonian eigenstates and eigenenergies as the complex roots $\lambda_{p,j}$ of a Bethe ansatz. Every $\lambda_{p,j}$ for $p\in \{1,2,... m\}$ must satisfy the following Bethe equations:

$(1+cd-c\lambda_{p,j})\frac{\lambda_{p,j}+cs}{\lambda_{p,j}-cs}=\prod_{q\neq p}^{m}\frac{\lambda_{p,j}-\lambda_{q,j}+c}{\lambda_{p,j}-\lambda_{q,j} -c}$,

then the Hamiltonian eigenvalues arise from the roots as:

$E_{s,m,j}^{(TC2)}=(\omega_c-\gamma)(m-s)+\gamma(m-s)^2+\frac{sg_c}{c}\prod_{p=1}^{m} (1-\frac{c}{\lambda_{p,j}})-g_c(sd+\frac{s}{c})\prod_{p=1}^{m} (1+\frac{c}{\lambda_{p,j}})$.

In the limit where $\gamma\to 0$ (and thus $c\to 0$), the above Bethe equations simplify to $\frac{2s}{\lambda_{p,j}}-\lambda_{p,j}-\frac{\Delta}{g_c}=\sum_{q\neq p}^{m}\frac{2}{\lambda_{p,j}-\lambda_{q,j}}$, and the eigenenergies to $E_{s,m,j}=\omega_{eg}(m-s)-g_c\sum_{p=1}^{m} \lambda_{p,j}$. Eigenstates follow similarly.

== Experiments ==
The Tavis–Cummings model has seen numerous experimental implementations verifying its phenomena, including several since 2009 virtually realizing the model on quantum computational platforms like superconducting qubits and circuit QED. Such experiments utilize the Tavis–Cummings Hamiltonian's ability to generate superradiance wherein the artificial atoms emit and absorb light from the field coherently, as though they were a single atom with a large total angular momentum. Superradiance, scaling dipole-interaction strength $g_c\propto\sqrt{N}$, and other features allow Tavis–Cummings-type dynamics to manifest quantum computationally and metrologically desirable states, such as Dicke states (joint eigenstates of $\hat{S}^2$ and $\hat{S}_z$) through global interactions, as was explored in the 2003 paper by Tessier et al.

One realization by Tuchman et al., in 2006, used a stream of ultracold Rubidium-87 atoms ($N\approx 2\times 10^5$), and observed cooperation number $s\approx 1.2 \times10^4$, or 12% its maximum possible value, indicating very high interatomic coherence relative to experimental capabilities of the time. This experiment also confirmed the scaling of the dipole-interaction; at the level of single atoms, dipole interactions are much weaker than monopolar interactions, so the ability of Tavis–Cummings dynamics to counteract the weakness of $\lVert \vec{d}_{eg}\rVert$ with quadrature addition of dipoles makes neutral atom control more feasible.

=== Circuit QED ===
A seminal result from Fink et al. in 2009 involved 3 transmons as virtual "atoms" with qubit-dependent Bohr frequencies $\hbar \omega_{eg}^{(j)}=\sqrt{8 E_C^{(j)}E_J^{(j)}} - E_C^{(j)}$ for controllable Josephson energy $E_J^{(j)}$ and experimentally determined single electron charging energy $E_C^{(j)}$, inside a microwave waveguide resonator which supplies a standing electric field at $\frac{\omega_c}{2\pi} = 6.729$GHz. To ensure symmetric coupling of the qubits to the field, each transmon was placed at an antinode of the standing wave, and to best conserve excitations by minimizing photon leakage, the resonator was kept ultracold (20mK) which ensured a high quality factor. Manipulating each qubit's Bohr frequency so only one qubit resonated with the field, the team measured each single-qubit coupling strength $g_{c}^{(j)} (1)$, then reintroduced the other qubits to compare the total coupling strength $g_c(N)$ with the average strength of the resonating qubits, $\overline{g_c (1)}$, confirming that $g_c(N)=\sqrt{N}\overline{g_c (1)}$. In addition, the team observed bright and dark states characterized by high emission rates and zero emissions respectively, for 2 and 3 active qubits, with the 3-qubit bright and dark states each being degenerate.

In addition to superconducting qubits, semiconducting qubits have also been a platform for Tavis–Cummings dynamics, such as in a 2018 investigation by van Woerkom et al. at ETH Zürich, in which two qubits constructed of double quantum dots (DQDs) coupled to a SQUID resonator, with the two DQDs separated by a distance of 42μm. The micrometer regime is a far greater distance than that over which semiconducting qubits had previously achieved entanglement, and the difficulty of long-range interactions in semiconducting qubits was at the time a major weakness compared to other quantum computing platforms, for which the Tavis–Cummings model's ability to form entanglement through global atom-field interactions is one solution. By observing the reflection amplitude of field waves between the SQUID array and the DQDs, the team isolated the photon number states as they smoothly coupled to the first qubit to form superpositional Jaynes-Cummings eigenstates when the first qubit tuned to the resonator. Similarly, they observed these hybrid states shift into a pair of bright states and a dark state (which did not interact with the light, and thus did not cause a dip in the reflection amplitude) when the second qubit was tuned to resonance. In addition to physical photons mediating the long-range entanglement at $\Delta=0$, the team found similar energy shifts at $\Delta\gg g_c$ signalling qubits interacting with "virtual" photons, measured by the phase shift of the field rather than the reflection amplitude.

== Limitations ==
Recent investigations by Johnson, Blaha, et al., have verified and explained two major regimes where the Tavis–Cummings model fails to predict physical reality, both following from systemic parameters approaching or exceeding the free spectral range $\nu_{FSR}= \frac{c}{L}$ based on the waveguide length $L$. The violating quantities are the coupling strength $g_c$, and the rate of photon-loss from atomic emissions into non-cavity modes, $\frac{g_c^2}{\gamma_l}$, where $\gamma_l$ is the single-atom spontaneous-emission rate into all modes. When $\nu_{FSR}\gg g_c$ and $\nu_{FSR}\gg \frac{g_c^2}{\gamma_l}$, the Tavis–Cummings model well-describes the system, since the atom-light interactions are suppressed for all but one mode, and the field intensity is not significantly attenuated due to atomic emissions into other modes. However, when $\nu_{FSR}\lesssim g_c$ then the coupling enters the so-called "superstrong" regime and atom-light interactions must consider multiple field-modes. More severely, when $\nu_{FSR} \lesssim \frac{g_c^2}{\gamma_l}$ then the atomic ensemble becomes optically thick, and the model must consider time-ordered interactions between the field and each atom, as atoms at the front of the ensemble will experience a more intense photonic wavefront than those at the back, due to the frontal atoms' absorptions and non-cavity mode emissions. This has the effect of interactions and correlations cascading successively across multiple atoms. As photons cross the waveguide and interact sequentially with the atoms in the ensemble, they accumulate phase at phenomenon-dependent rates. The total phase accumulated by electromagnetic waves in one round-trip of the waveguide may manifest resonances causing high transmission rates under specific dephasings $\Delta$ and emission rates $\frac{g_{c}^2}{\gamma_{l}}$, and the locations of these resonances differs between the standard Tavis–Cummings model and the team's proposed "cascade" model. Using a fluid of ultracool Cesium atoms surrounding a nanofiber-section of a 30m fiber-ring resonator, the team coupled the atoms to the light passing through the nanofiber via an evanescent field, measuring the light's transmission for variable $\Delta$ and $g_c$, into the superstrong coupling and cascade regimes. The data from the nanofiber-Cesium experiment agreed better with the cascade model's predictions than with the Tavis–Cummings', specifically in the parametrically violating regimes above.
