= Equiprobability =

Events with equal probabilities of occurring

Equiprobability is a property for a collection of events that each have the same probability of occurring. In statistics and probability theory it is applied in the discrete uniform distribution and the equidistribution theorem for rational numbers. If there are $n$ events under consideration, the probability of each occurring is $\frac{1}{n}.$

In philosophy it corresponds to a concept that allows one to assign equal probabilities to outcomes when they are judged to be equipossible or to be "equally likely" in some sense. The best-known formulation of the rule is Laplace's principle of indifference (or principle of insufficient reason), which states that, when "we have no other information than" that exactly $N$ mutually exclusive events can occur, we are justified in assigning each the probability $\frac{1}{N}.$ This subjective assignment of probabilities is especially justified for situations such as rolling dice and lotteries since these experiments carry a symmetry structure, and one's state of knowledge must clearly be invariant under this symmetry.

A similar argument could lead to the seemingly absurd conclusion that the sun is as likely to rise as to not rise tomorrow morning. However, the conclusion that the sun is equally likely to rise as it is to not rise is only absurd when additional information is known, such as the laws of gravity and the sun's history. Similar applications of the concept are effectively instances of circular reasoning, with "equally likely" events being assigned equal probabilities, which means in turn that they are equally likely. Despite this, the notion remains useful in probabilistic and statistical modeling.

In Bayesian probability, one needs to establish prior probabilities for the various hypotheses before applying Bayes' theorem. One procedure is to assume that these prior probabilities have some symmetry which is typical of the experiment, and then assign a prior which is proportional to the Haar measure for the symmetry group: this generalization of equiprobability is known as the principle of transformation groups and leads to misuse of equiprobability as a model for incertitude.

== See also ==
- Equal probability sampling
- Principle of indifference
- Laplacian smoothing
- Uninformative prior
- A priori probability
- Aequiprobabilism
- Uniform probability distributions:
  - Continuous
  - Discrete
- Information gain
