= Scalapino =

Scalapino is a surname. Notable people with the surname include:

- Douglas James Scalapino (born 1933), American physicist
- Leslie Scalapino (1944–2010), American poet, experimental prose writer, playwright, essayist, and editor
- Robert A. Scalapino (1919–2011), American political scientist
