= Equipossibility =

Concept in possibility theory

Equipossibility is a philosophical concept in possibility theory that is a precursor to the notion of equiprobability in probability theory. It is used to distinguish what can occur in a probability experiment. For example, it is the difference between viewing the possible results of rolling a six sided dice as {1,2,3,4,5,6} rather than {6, not 6}. The former (equipossible) set contains equally possible alternatives, while the latter does not because there are five times as many alternatives inherent in 'not 6' as in 6. This is true even if the die is biased so that 6 and 'not 6' are equally likely to occur (equiprobability).

The Principle of Indifference of Laplace states that equipossible alternatives may be accorded equal probabilities if nothing more is known about the underlying probability distribution. However, it is a matter of contention whether the concept of equipossibility, also called equispecificity (from equispecific), can truly be distinguished from the concept of equiprobability.

In Bayesian inference, one definition of equipossibility is "a transformation group which leaves invariant one's state of knowledge". Equiprobability is then defined by normalizing the Haar measure of this symmetry group. This is known as the principle of transformation groups.
