= Credence (statistics) =

Measure of belief strength used in statistics

Credence or degree of belief is a statistical term that expresses how much a person believes that a proposition is true. As an example, a reasonable person will believe with close to 50% credence that a fair coin will land on heads the next time it is flipped (minus the probability that the coin lands on its edge). If the prize for correctly predicting the coin flip is $100, then a reasonable risk-neutral person will wager $49 on heads, but will not wager $51 on heads.

Credence is a measure of belief strength, expressed as a percentage. Credence values range from 0% to 100%. Credence is closely related to odds, and a person's level of credence is directly related to the odds at which they will place a bet. Credence is especially important in Bayesian statistics.

If a bag contains 4 red marbles and 1 blue marble, and a person withdraws one marble at random, then they should believe with 80% credence that the random marble will be red. In this example, the probability of drawing a red marble is 80%.

Credence values can be based entirely on subjective feelings. For example, if Alice is fairly certain that she saw Bob at the grocery store on Monday, then she might say, "I believe with 90% credence that Bob was at the grocery store on Monday." If the prize for being correct is $100, then Alice will wager $89 that her memory is accurate, but she would not be willing to wager $91 or more. Given that Alice is 90% credent, this level of belief can be expressed as gambling odds in the following ways:

- 90% credence
- 1 / 9 fractional odds (1 to 9)
- 1.11 decimal odds
- −900 moneyline odds
- The return on a $100 wager is $11.11 (plus the $100 initial wager).

See the article odds for conversion equations.
