= Principle of maximum caliber =

Statistical principle

The principle of maximum caliber (MaxCal) or maximum path entropy principle, suggested by E. T. Jaynes, can be considered as a generalization of the principle of maximum entropy. It postulates that the most unbiased probability distribution of paths is the one that maximizes their Shannon entropy. This entropy of paths is sometimes called the "caliber" of the system, and is given by the path integral

$$S[\rho[x()]] = -\int D_x \,\, \rho[x()]  \, \ln {\rho[x()] \over \pi[x()]}$$

== History ==
The principle of maximum caliber was proposed by Edwin T. Jaynes in 1980, in an article titled The Minimum Entropy Production Principle in the context of deriving a principle for non-equilibrium statistical mechanics.

== Mathematical formulation ==
The principle of maximum caliber can be considered as a generalization of the principle of maximum entropy defined over the paths space, the caliber $S$ is of the form

$$S[\rho[x()]] = -\int D_x \rho[x()] \ln {\rho[x()] \over \pi[x()]}$$

where for n-constraints

$$\int D_x \rho[x()] A_n[x()] = \langle A_n[x()] \rangle = a_n$$

it is shown that the probability functional is

$$\rho[x()] = \exp\left\{ - \sum_{i=0}^n \alpha_n A_n[x()] \right\}.$$

In the same way, for n dynamical constraints defined in the interval $t \in [0,T]$ of the form

$$\int D_x \rho[x()] L_n(x(t),\dot x(t), t ) = \langle L_n(x(t),\dot x(t),t ) \rangle = \ell(t)$$

it is shown that the probability functional is

$$\rho[x()] = \exp\left\{ - \sum_{i=0}^n \int_0^T dt \, \alpha_n(t) L_n(x(t),\dot x(t), t ) \right\}.$$

== Maximum caliber and statistical mechanics ==
Following Jaynes' hypothesis, there exist publications in which the principle of maximum caliber appears to emerge as a result of the construction of a framework which describes a statistical representation of systems with many degrees of freedom.

== See also ==
- Maximal entropy random walk
