= Mind projection fallacy =

Informal fallacy that the way one sees the world reflects the way the world really is

The mind projection fallacy is an informal fallacy that occurs when a person believes in factual claims (as distinguished from facts) solely based on mental or sensory experiences, which are often interpreted as objective properties. That is, someone's subjective judgments are "projected" to be inherent properties of an object, rather than being related to personal perception. One consequence is that others may be assumed to share the same perception, or that they are irrational or misinformed if they do not. The idea has been compared to Plato's allegory of the cave.

For example, it is fallacious to say that sweetness is an inherent property of sugar molecules; instead, it results from the human perception of those molecules. Similarly, a person may dismiss a subject as uninteresting based on their personal lack of interest, or believe in a flat earth based on their intuitive perception that the world around them is flat.

There is also a "negative" form of the fallacy, in which someone assumes that their own lack of knowledge about a phenomenon (a fact about their state of mind) means that the phenomenon is not or cannot be understood (a fact about reality; see also Map and territory). This form of the fallacy is similar to the argument from ignorance.

== History ==
The mind projection fallacy was first described by physicist and Bayesian philosopher E. T. Jaynes, who wrote that:

[I]n studying probability theory, it was vaguely troubling to see reference to "gaussian random variables", or "stochastic processes", or "stationary time series", or "disorder", as if the property of being gaussian, random, stochastic, stationary, or disorderly is a real property, like the property of possessing mass or length, existing in Nature. Indeed, some seek to develop statistical tests to determine the presence of these properties in their data...
Once one has grasped the idea, one sees the Mind Projection Fallacy everywhere; what we have been taught as deep wisdom, is stripped of its pretensions and seen to be instead a foolish non sequitur. The error occurs in two complementary forms, which we might indicate thus: (A) (My own imagination) → (Real property of Nature), [or] (B) (My own ignorance) → (Nature is indeterminate)

Jaynes described the fallacy as occurring when someone thinks that the way they see the world reflects the way the world really is, going as far as assuming the real existence of imagined objects. He used the example of failing to distinguish between "The room is noisy" and "There is noise in the room"; one statement is ontological, describing the nature of reality, and the other is epistemological, describing someone's personal perception.

A 2012 edition of the 1989 conference proceedings where Jaynes described the mind projection fallacy called it a "fundamental contribution to the art and science of thinking".

== Usage ==
Jaynes used the concept to argue against the Copenhagen interpretation of quantum mechanics. He also criticized the idea of aleatory uncertainty (inherent randomness), with one author describing the issue as, "our uncertainty is ascribed to an inherent property of nature, or, more generally, our models of reality are confused with reality. From a pragmatic point of view, regardless of one's philosophical position on this issue, all one can say is that there is not sufficient information to make perfect predictions or deductions." It has also been used to criticize the concept of emergence and to discuss the nature of probability in legal contexts.

The mind projection fallacy has been described as a common error in philosophy.

== Cognitive science ==
The mind projection fallacy has been described as a potential issue in artificial intelligence research. In addition, the tendency of humans to anthropomorphize non-human intelligences as having human-like minds has been described a type of mind projection fallacy.

== See also ==
- Psychologist's fallacy – Fallacy in which subjective experience is assumed to reflect the true nature of an event
- Reification (fallacy) – Fallacy of treating an abstraction as if it were a real thing
- Map–territory relation – Relationship between an object and a representation of that object
