= Psychologist's fallacy =

Fallacy in which subjective experience is assumed to reflect the true nature of an event

The psychologist's fallacy is an informal fallacy that occurs when an observer assumes that their subjective experience reflects the true nature of an event. The fallacy was named by William James in the 19th century:

The great snare of the psychologist is the confusion of his own standpoint with that of the mental fact about which he is making his report. I shall hereafter call this the 'psychologist's fallacy' par excellence.

== Alternative statements of the fallacy ==
Some sources state the psychologist's fallacy as if it were about two people—the observer and the observed—rather than about one observer and a fact. For example,

Psychologist's fallacy, the fallacy, to which the psychologist is peculiarly liable, of reading into the mind he is examining what is true of his own; especially of reading into lower minds what is true of higher.

A danger to be avoided known as the 'psychologist's fallacy'. This arises from the fact that the experimenter is apt to suppose that the subject will respond to a stimulus or an order in the same way as he himself would respond in the circumstances.

In this alternative form, the fallacy is described as a specific form of the "similar to me" stereotype: what is unknown about another person is assumed, for simplicity, using things the observer knows about themself. Such a bias leads the observer to presuppose knowledge or skills, or lack of such, possessed by another person. For example, "I (or everyone I know or most people I know) don't know very much about chemistry. Therefore I can assume that this other person knows very little about chemistry." This assumption may be true in any number of specific cases, making inductive reasoning based on this assumption cogent, but is not applicable in the general case (there are many people who are very knowledgeable in the field of chemistry), and therefore deductive reasoning based on this assumption may be invalid.

These alternative statements, however, do not match what William James characterized when he named the fallacy.

== Examples from literature ==
Victor Frankl (1946) "Man's Search for Meaning":

Logotherapy is neither teaching nor preaching. It is as far removed from logical reasoning as it is from moral exhortation.

To put it figuratively, the role played by a logotherapist is that of an eye specialist rather than that of a painter. A painter tries to convey to us a picture of the world as he sees it; an ophthalmologist tries to enable us to see the world as it really is.

The logotherapist's role consists of widening and broadening the visual eld of the patient so that the whole spectrum of potential meaning becomes conscious and visible to him.

== See also ==
- Historian's fallacy
- Mind projection fallacy
