= Wine/water paradox =

Probability theory paradox

The wine/water paradox is an apparent paradox in probability theory. It is stated by Michael Deakin as follows:

A mixture is known to contain a mix of wine and water in proportions such that the amount of wine divided by the amount of water is a ratio $x$ lying in the interval $1/3 \le x \le 3$ (i.e. 25-75% wine). We seek the probability, $P^\ast$ say, that $x \le 2$. (i.e. less than or equal to 66%.)

The core of the paradox is in finding consistent and justifiable simultaneous prior distributions for $x$ and $\frac{1}{x}$.

== Calculation ==
This calculation is the demonstration of the paradoxical conclusion when making use of the principle of indifference.

To recapitulate, We do not know $x$, the wine to water ratio. When considering the numbers above, it is only known that it lies in an interval between the minimum of one quarter wine over three quarters water on one end (i.e. 25% wine), to the maximum of three quarters wine over one quarter water on the other (i.e. 75% wine). In term of ratios, $x_\mathrm{min}=\frac{1/4}{3/4} = \frac{1}{3}$ resp. $x_\mathrm{max}=\frac{3/4}{1/4} = 3$.

Now, making use of the principle of indifference, we may assume that $x$ is uniformly distributed. Then the chance of finding the ratio $x$ below any given fixed threshold $x_t$, with $x_\mathrm{min}<x_t<x_\mathrm{max}$, should linearly depend on the value $x_t$. So the probability value is the number

$$\operatorname{Prob}\{x \le x_t\} = \frac{x_t-x_\mathrm{min}}{x_\mathrm{max}-x_\mathrm{min}} = \frac{1}{8} (3x_t - 1).$$

As a function of the threshold value $x_t$, this is the linearly growing function that is $0$ resp. $1$ at the end points $x_\mathrm{min}$ resp. the larger $x_\mathrm{max}$.

Consider the threshold $x_t = 2$, as in the example of the original formulation above. This is two parts wine vs. one part water, i.e. 66% wine. With this we conclude that

$$\operatorname{Prob}\{x \le 2\} = \frac{1}{8}(3\cdot 2 - 1) = \frac{5}{8}$$.

Now consider $y = \frac{1}{x}$, the inverted ratio of water to wine but the equivalent wine/water mixture threshold. It lies between the inverted bounds. Again using the principle of indifference, we get

$$\operatorname{Prob}\{y \ge y_t\} = \frac{x_\mathrm{max}(1 - x_\mathrm{min}\,y_t)}{x_\mathrm{max} - x_\mathrm{min}} = \frac{3}{8} (3 - y_t)$$.

This is the function which is $0$ resp. $1$ at the end points $\tfrac{1}{x_\mathrm{min}}$ resp. the smaller $\tfrac{1}{x_\mathrm{max}}$.

Now taking the corresponding threshold $y_t = \frac{1}{x_t} = \frac{1}{2}$ (also half as much water as wine). We conclude that

$$\operatorname{Prob}\left\{y \ge \tfrac{1}{2}\right\} = \frac{3}{8}\frac{3\cdot 2 - 1}{2} = \frac{15}{16} = \frac{3}{2}\frac{5}{8}$$.

The second probability always exceeds the first by a factor of $\frac{x_\mathrm{max}}{x_t} \ge 1$. For our example the number is $\frac{3}{2}$.

=== Paradoxical conclusion ===
Since $y = \frac{1}{x}$, we get

$$\frac{5}{8} = \operatorname{Prob}\{x \le 2\} = P^* = \operatorname{Prob}\left\{y \ge \frac{1}{2}\right\} = \frac{15}{16} > \frac{5}{8}$$,

a contradiction.
