= Fred Cummings =

American physicist and professor (1931–2019)

- Born: Frederick William Cummings; November 21, 1931; New Orleans, Louisiana, U.S.
- Died: January 31, 2019 (aged 87); Marin County, California, U.S.
- Education: Stanford University
- Known for: Jaynes–Cummings model Tavis–Cummings model
- Scientific career
- Fields: Theoretical physics Cavity quantum electrodynamics Biophysics
- Workplaces: University of California, Riverside
- Thesis: Comparison of quantum and semiclassical radiation theories with application to the beam maser (1962)
- Doctoral advisor: E. T. Jaynes

Frederick Williams Cummings (November 21, 1931 - January 31, 2019) was an American theoretical physicist and professor at the University of California, Riverside. He specialised in cavity quantum electrodynamics, many-body theory, non-linear dynamics, and biophysics. He developed the Jaynes–Cummings model, one atom interacting with a quantized electromagnetic field; as well as the extension of this to N atoms, known as the Tavis–Cummings model.

== Life ==
Frederick Williams Cummings was born in New Orleans, Louisiana in 1931. He served in the United States Army from 1950 to 1952, in the infantry in Korea.

He received his Bachelor of Science from Louisiana State University in 1955 and his Ph.D. from Stanford University in 1962. Edwin Thompson Jaynes was his doctoral supervisor, with whom he worked on the Jaynes–Cumming model.

While finishing his thesis, Cummings worked at the Aeronutronic Research Labs, Ford Motor Co. in Newport Beach, California from 1960 to 1963.

He became a professor at University of California, Riverside (UCR). With his doctoral student Michael Tavis, he extended the Jaynes–Cummings model to the Tavis–Cummings model in 1968.

The revival probabilities predicted by Jaynes–Cumming model were first experimentally demonstrated in 1987 by Gerhard Rempe, Herbert Walther, and Norbert Klein.

After thirty years at UCR Physics department, Cummings became emeritus professor in 1993. In the last twenty years his interest has turned to questions of biophysics of development and evolution.

Cummings died on January 31, 2019, in Marin County, California.

=== Personal life ===
In 1964, he married Kathleen Sturgis. They had one child.
