= Michael A. B. Deakin =

Australian mathematician and educator (1939–2014)

Michael Andrew Bernard Deakin (12 August 1939 – 5 August 2014) was an Australian mathematician and mathematics educator. He was known for his work as a writer and editor of Function, a mathematics magazine aimed at high school students, and as a biographer of ancient Greek mathematician Hypatia.

== Early life and education ==
Michael Andrew Bernard Deakin was born on 12 August 1939.

He grew up in Tasmania, and moved to Melbourne late in his high school education, taking a matriculation year studying Latin at St Patrick's College, East Melbourne before entering the University of Melbourne in 1957. He completed a bachelor's degree with second-class honours in mathematics at Melbourne in 1961. He went on to earn a master's degree there in 1963, with a thesis on integral equations supervised by Russell Love.

In 1975, he earned a master's degree in education from the University of Exeter.

== Career ==
Deakin moved to the University of Chicago in 1963 for graduate study, and completed his Ph.D. in 1966, under the supervision of mathematical biophysicist Herbert Landahl.

He became a lecturer at Monash University in Melbourne in 1967, butin 1970 moved to Papua New Guinea to become reader-in-charge in the mathematics department of the Institute of Higher Technical Education. He returned to Monash as a senior reader in 1973.

After earning a master's degree in education in 1975 from the University of Exeter, he remained at Monash for the rest of his career.

=== Function ===
In 1976 a group of mathematicians at Monash University led by department chair Gordon Preston recognized the need for a journal focused on "mathematics as mathematicians themselves would recognise it, but addressed to secondary students". A secondary but explicit goal was to encourage young women in mathematics, as at that time their under-representation was already recognized. Later, over beers with friends from other disciplines, Deakin found the name for the new journal, Function. The journal was published from 1977 to 2004, and Deakin became a founding member of its editorial board, its most frequent contributor, and, for much of its existence, its editor-in-chief.

=== Hypatia ===
Deakin published the first of his several articles on Hypatia in 1992 in Function. In 2007, he published the book Hypatia of Alexandria: Mathematician and Martyr (Prometheus Books). Aimed at a popular audience, the book is "at least in part, a response to Maria Dzielska's Hypatia of Alexandria", which had focused on the historical and literary legacy of Hypatia at the expense of her mathematics, and which Deakin had previously reviewed for the American Mathematical Monthly. In his book, Deakin organizes the work of other scholars on Hypatia's mathematics, particularly relying on the earlier work of Wilbur Knorr, rather than formulating new theories on this aspect of Hypatia's work. He argues that, unlike some other neoplatonists of her time, Hypatia was not opposed to Christianity, and that the Christian mob that killed her likely misunderstood her philosophical position. However, his book has been criticized for treating Hypatia more as an idealised icon, or a caricature of a female mathematician, than as a realistic person of her times.

== Recognition and honours ==
In 2003, Deakin was the recipient of a B. H. Neumann Award of the Australian Mathematics Trust, for his "rich and varied commitment to mathematics enrichment".

== Personal life and death ==
Deakin died on 5 August 2014, survived by his widow, Rayda, and the children of his first marriage.

== See also ==
- Wine/water paradox
