= Douglas James Scalapino =

American physicist (born 1933)

Douglas Scalapino
- Education: Yale University; Stanford University
- Known for: Condensed matter physics
- Awards: Julius Edgar Lillenfeld Prize; Eugene Feenberg Medal; National Academy of Sciences
- Scientific career
- Workplaces: Washington University in St. Louis; University of Pennsylvania; UCSB
- Academic advisors: Edwin Thompson Jaynes

Douglas James Scalapino (born December 10, 1933, San Francisco, California) is an American physicist noted for his contribution to theoretical condensed matter physics.

== Career ==
Scalapino completed his undergraduate degree at Yale in 1955, and his PhD at Stanford in 1961. He then followed Ed Jaynes to become a research associate at Washington University in St. Louis from 1961 to 1962 and then moved to University of Pennsylvania where he attained the rank of full professor in 1969. He is currently a Research Professor of Physics at the University of California, Santa Barbara.

In 1991 he became a member of the National Academy of Sciences and in 1992 he became a fellow of the American Academy of Arts and Sciences. In 1998, he received the Julius Edgar Lilienfeld Prize. In 2013, he and Patrick Lee received the Eugene Feenberg Medal.
