= Brian Skyrms =

American philosopher (born 1938)

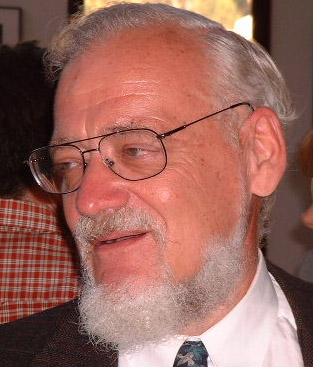
Professor Brian Skyrms

Brian Skyrms (born 1938) is an American philosopher, Distinguished Professor of Logic and Philosophy of Science and Economics at the University of California, Irvine, and a professor of philosophy at Stanford University. He has worked on problems in the philosophy of science, causation, decision theory, game theory, and the foundations of probability.

== Education and career ==
Skyrms graduated from Lehigh University in 1960 and earned his Ph.D. in philosophy from the University of Pittsburgh in 1964. He taught at several different universities, before teaching at the University of Illinois, Chicago from 1968 until 1980, when he moved to the University of California, Irvine.

Skyrms is a Fellow of the American Academy of Arts & Sciences and one of two living philosophers (along with Allan Gibbard) to be elected a Fellow of the National Academy of Sciences.

== Philosophical work ==
Most recently, his work has focused on the evolution of social norms using evolutionary game theory. His two recent books Evolution of the Social Contract and The Stag Hunt are both on this topic. These books use arguments and examples from evolutionary game theory to cover topics of interest to political philosophy, philosophy of social science, philosophy of language, and the philosophy of biology.

Skymrs has shown that in the 'cake partition' game, the only evolutionarily stable strategy is demanding 50% of the cake.

== Books ==
- Ten Great Ideas about Chance (with Persi Diaconis, Princeton University Press, 2018)
- Social Dynamics, Oxford University Press 2014.
- Signals: Evolution, Learning, and Information, Oxford University Press 2010
- The Stag Hunt and the Evolution of Social Structure, Cambridge University Press 2004
- Evolution of the Social Contract, Cambridge University Press 1996
- The Dynamics of Rational Deliberation, Harvard University Press 1990
- Pragmatics and Empiricism, Yale University Press 1984
- Causal Necessity, Yale University Press 1980
- Choice and Chance: An Introduction to Inductive Logic, Dickenson 1966, 4th ed. Wadsworth 1999. (Translated into German as: Einführung in die induktive Logik, Lang 1989.)
