= Edwin Thompson Jaynes =

American academic (1922–1998)

E. T. Jaynes
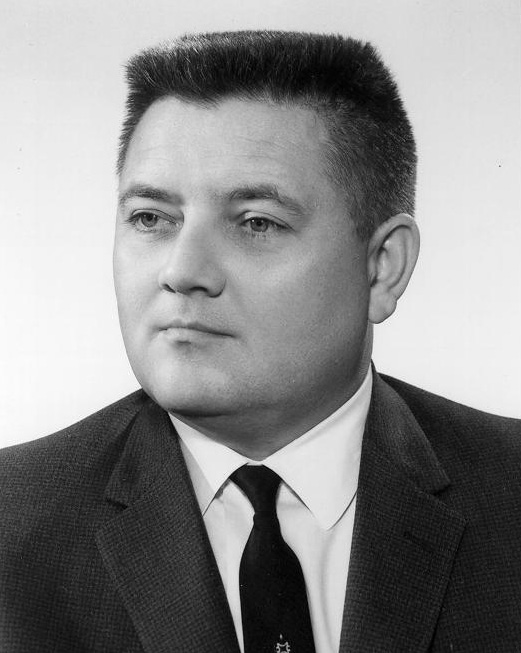
- Edwin Thompson Jaynes, c. 1960.
- Born: July 5, 1922; Waterloo, Iowa, U.S.
- Died: April 30, 1998 (aged 75); St. Louis, Missouri, U.S.
- Education: Cornell College; Princeton University
- Known for: Maximum entropy thermodynamics Bayesian theory Jaynes–Cummings model Mind projection fallacy
- Scientific career
- Fields: Physicist
- Workplaces: Washington University in St. Louis
- Thesis: An electronic theory of ferroelectricity (1948)
- Doctoral advisor: Eugene Wigner
- Doctoral students: Fred Cummings; Joseph H. Eberly; Douglas James Scalapino

Jaynes around 1982

Edwin Thompson Jaynes (July 5, 1922 – April 30, 1998) was the Wayman Crow Distinguished Professor of Physics at Washington University in St. Louis. He wrote extensively on statistical mechanics and on foundations of probability and statistical inference, initiating in 1957 the maximum entropy interpretation of thermodynamics as being a particular application of more general Bayesian/information theory techniques (although he argued this was already implicit in the works of Josiah Willard Gibbs). Jaynes strongly promoted the interpretation of probability theory as an extension of logic.

In 1963, together with his doctoral student Fred Cummings, he modeled the evolution of a two-level atom in an electromagnetic field, in a fully quantized way. This model is known as the Jaynes–Cummings model.

A particular focus of his work was the construction of logical principles for assigning prior probability distributions; see the principle of maximum entropy, the principle of maximum caliber, the principle of transformation groups and Laplace's principle of indifference. Other contributions include the mind projection fallacy.

Jaynes' book, Probability Theory: The Logic of Science (2003) gathers various threads of modern thinking about Bayesian probability and statistical inference, develops the notion of probability theory as extended logic, and contrasts the advantages of Bayesian techniques with the results of other approaches. This book, which he dedicated to Harold Jeffreys, was published posthumously in 2003 (from an incomplete manuscript that was edited by Larry Bretthorst). Jaynes coined the term 'mind projection fallacy' to describe the error of confusing subjective states of knowledge with objective properties of physical systems. This idea became influential in debates over the interpretation of probability and quantum mechanics.

Other of his doctoral students included Joseph H. Eberly and Douglas James Scalapino.

== See also ==
- Differential entropy
- Limiting density of discrete points
