= Coherence length =

Distance over which a propagating wave maintains a certain degree of coherence

In physics, coherence length is the propagation distance over which a coherent wave (e.g. an electromagnetic wave) maintains a specified degree of coherence. Wave interference is strong when the paths taken by all of the interfering waves differ by less than the coherence length. A wave with a longer coherence length is closer to a perfect sinusoidal wave. Coherence length is important in holography and telecommunications engineering.

This article focuses on the coherence of classical electromagnetic fields. In quantum mechanics, there is a mathematically analogous concept of the quantum coherence length of a wave function.

== Formulas ==
In radio-band systems, the coherence length is approximated by

$$L = \frac{ c }{\, n\, \mathrm{\Delta} f \,} \approx \frac{ \lambda^2 }{\, n\, \mathrm{\Delta} \lambda \,} ~,$$

where $\, c \,$ is the speed of light in vacuum, $\, n \,$ is the refractive index of the medium, and $\, \mathrm{\Delta} f \,$ is the bandwidth of the source or $\, \lambda \,$ is the signal wavelength and $\, \Delta \lambda \,$ is the width of the range of wavelengths in the signal.

In optical communications and optical coherence tomography (OCT), assuming that the source has a Gaussian emission spectrum, the roundtrip coherence length $\, L \,$ is given by

$L = \frac{\, 2 \ln 2 \,}{ \pi } \, \frac{ \lambda^2 }{\, n_g \, \mathrm{\Delta} \lambda \,}~,$

where $\, \lambda \,$ is the central wavelength of the source, $n_g$ is the group refractive index of the medium, and $\, \mathrm{\Delta} \lambda \,$ is the (FWHM) spectral width of the source. If the source has a Gaussian spectrum with FWHM spectral width $\mathrm{\Delta} \lambda$, then a path offset of $\, \pm L \,$ will reduce the fringe visibility to 50%. This is a roundtrip coherence length; this definition is applied in applications like OCT where the light traverses the measured displacement twice (as in a Michelson interferometer). In transmissive applications, such as with a Mach–Zehnder interferometer, the light traverses the displacement only once, and the coherence length is effectively doubled.

The coherence length can also be measured using a Michelson interferometer and is the optical path length difference of a self-interfering laser beam which corresponds to $\, \frac{1}{\, e \,} \approx 37\% \,$ fringe visibility, where the fringe visibility is defined as

$$V = \frac{\; I_\max - I_\min \;}{ I_\max + I_\min} ~,$$

where $\, I \,$ is the fringe intensity.

In long-distance transmission systems, the coherence length may be reduced by propagation factors such as dispersion, scattering, and diffraction.

== Lasers ==
Multimode helium–neon lasers have a typical coherence length on the order of centimeters, while the coherence length of longitudinally single-mode lasers can exceed 1 km. Semiconductor lasers can reach some 100 m, but small, inexpensive semiconductor lasers have shorter lengths, with one source claiming up to 20 cm, although multi-mode diodes will have even shorter coherence lengths. Singlemode fiber lasers with linewidths of a few kHz can have coherence lengths exceeding 100 km. Similar coherence lengths can be reached with optical frequency combs due to the narrow linewidth of each tooth. Non-zero visibility is present only for short intervals of pulses repeated after cavity length distances up to this long coherence length.

== Other light sources ==
Tolansky's An introduction to Interferometry has a chapter on sources which quotes a line width of around 0.052 angstroms for each of the Sodium D lines in an uncooled low-pressure sodium lamp, corresponding to a coherence length of around 67 mm for each line by itself. Cooling the low pressure sodium discharge to liquid nitrogen temperatures increases the individual D line coherence length by a factor of 6. A very narrow-band interference filter would be required to isolate an individual D line.

== See also ==
- Coherence time
- Superconducting coherence length
- Spatial coherence
