= Photon antibunching =

Phenomenon in quantum optics

Photon detections as a function of time for a) antibunching (e.g. light emitted from a single atom), b) random (e.g. a coherent state, laser beam), and c) bunching (chaotic light). τ_{c} is the coherence time (the time scale of photon or intensity fluctuations).

Photon antibunching generally refers to a light field with photons more equally spaced than a coherent laser field, a signature being a measured two-time correlation suppressed below that of a coherent laser field. More specifically, it can refer to sub-Poissonian photon statistics, that is a photon number distribution for which the variance is less than the mean. A coherent state, as output by a laser far above threshold, has Poissonian statistics yielding random photon spacing; while a thermal light field has super-Poissonian statistics and yields bunched photon spacing. In the thermal (bunched) case, the number of fluctuations is larger than a coherent state; for an antibunched source they are smaller.

== Explanation ==
The variance of the photon number distribution is

$$V_n=\langle \Delta n^2\rangle=\langle n^2\rangle-\langle n\rangle^2= \left\langle \left(a^{\dagger}a\right)^2\right\rangle-\langle a^{\dagger}a\rangle ^2.$$

Using commutation relations, this can be written as

$$V_n=\langle {(a^{\dagger}})^2a^2 \rangle+\langle a^{\dagger}a\rangle-\langle a^{\dagger}a\rangle ^2.$$

This can be written as

$$V_n-\langle n\rangle=\langle (a^\dagger)^2 a^2\rangle  -\langle a^{\dagger}a\rangle^2.$$

The second-order intensity correlation function (for zero delay time) is defined as

$$g^{(2)}(0)={{\langle (a^\dagger)^2 a^2\rangle}\over{\langle a^{\dagger}a\rangle^2}}.$$

This quantity is basically the probability of detecting two simultaneous photons, normalized by the probability of detecting two photons at once for a random photon source. Here and after we assume stationary counting statistics.

Then we have

$${{1}\over{(\langle n\rangle)^2}}(V_n-\langle n\rangle) =g^{(2)}(0)-1.$$

Then we see that sub-Poisson photon statistics, one definition of photon antibunching, is given by $g^{(2)}(0) < 1$. We can equivalently express antibunching by $Q< 0$ where the Mandel Q parameter is defined as

$$Q\equiv \frac{V_n}{\langle n \rangle}-1.$$

If the field had a classical stochastic process underlying it, say a positive definite probability distribution for photon number, the variance would have to be greater than or equal to the mean. This can be shown by an application of the Cauchy–Schwarz inequality to the definition of $g^{(2)}(0)$. Sub-Poissonian fields violate this, and hence are nonclassical in the sense that there can be no underlying positive definite probability distribution for photon number (or intensity).

Photon antibunching by this definition was first proposed by Carmichael and Walls and first observed by Kimble, Mandel, and Dagenais in resonance fluorescence. A driven atom cannot emit two photons at once, and so in this case $g^{(2)}(0)=0$. An experiment with more precision that did not require subtraction of a background count rate was done for a single atom in an ion trap by Walther et al.

A more general definition for photon antibunching concerns the slope of the correlation function away from zero time delay. It can also be shown by an application of the Cauchy–Schwarz inequality to the time dependent intensity correlation function

$$g^{(2)}(\tau)={{\langle a^{\dagger}(0)a^{\dagger}(\tau)a(\tau)a(0)\rangle}\over{\langle a^{\dagger}a\rangle^2}}.$$

It can be shown that for a classical positive definite probability distribution to exist (i.e. for the field to be classical) $g^{(2)}(\tau) \leq g^{(2)}(0)$. Hence a rise in the second order intensity correlation function at early times is also nonclassical. This initial rise is photon antibunching.

Another way of looking at this time dependent correlation function, inspired by quantum trajectory theory is

$$g^{(2)}(\tau)={{\langle a^{\dagger}a\rangle_C}\over{\langle a^{\dagger}a\rangle}}$$

where

$$\langle O \rangle_C \equiv \langle \Psi_C |O|\Psi_C\rangle.$$

with $|\Psi_C\rangle$ is the state conditioned on previous detection of a photon at time $\tau=0$.

== Experiments ==
Spatial antibunching has been observed in photon pairs produced by spontaneous parametric down-conversion.

== See also ==
- Degree of coherence
- Fock state
- Hong–Ou–Mandel effect
- Hanbury Brown and Twiss effect
- Squeezed coherent state

== Sources ==
- Article based on text from Qwiki, reproduced under the GNU Free Documentation License: see Photon Antibunching
