= Asenjo =

Asenjo is a surname. Notable people with the surname include:

- Juan Asenjo (born 1949), Chilean chemical engineer who specialises in biotechnology
- Juan Asenjo Pelegrina (born 1945), Roman Catholic Archbishop of Seville
- Ana Asenjo Garcia 21st century Spanish physicist

== Arts ==
- Francisco Asenjo Barbieri (1823–1894), Spanish composer
- Genevieve L. Asenjo, Filipino poet, novelist, translator and literary scholar
- Nina Frick Asenjo (1884–1963), Chilean pianist and composer

== Sports ==
- Iván César Asenjo (born 1982), Chilean footballer and football manager
- Rommel Asenjo (born 1988), Filipino boxer
- Sabina Asenjo (born 1986) Spanish athlete
- Sergio Asenjo (born 1989), Spanish footballer
- Daniela Asenjo (born 1991), Chilean professional boxer
- Mauricio Asenjo (born 1994), Argentine footballer
- Mía Asenjo (born 2003), American footballer
