= Three-photon interference =

Physical phenomenon

In multi-photon interferometry, two or more photons propagate through multiple possible paths and are subsequently detected. The resulting detection statistics are determined by quantum-mechanical probability amplitudes: all possible multi-photon paths must be added coherently, and their interference produces characteristic patterns. These interference patterns reveal signatures of quantum effects.

Multi-photon interference is a hallmark of optical non-classicality, as it provides a direct probe of the uniquely quantum properties of light. The quantum behavior of photons cannot be understood merely by attenuating a classical electromagnetic field down to the single-photon level; experiments have shown that such attenuated classical states reproduce classical predictions without revealing genuinely non-classical features. To access truly quantum phenomena, one must work with light sources that possess intrinsically non-classical photon statistics. Multi photon interference is one such way to probe non-classical feature of light.

Three photon interference is predicted to exhibit correlations that involve all three photons simultaneously and cannot be reduced to any combination of pairwise (two-photon) correlations. The appearance of such irreducible three-photon correlations is regarded as a defining signature of genuine three-particle interference. Multi photon interferometry experiments were largely limited to two-photon interference effects. In 2017, two experiments were conducted showing genuine three photon interference effects.

== History ==
The nature of light has always been eluded mankind, from Isaac Newton's claim that light is composed of particles, to Christiaan Huygens' wave theory confirmed by Thomas Young's double slit experiment and James Clerk Maxwell's theory of electromagnetism, and finally ending up with the quantum picture of light, first proposed by Albert Einstein to explain photoelectric effect in 1905. With the advent of quantum mechanics in 1925, the work of Niels Bohr, Erwin Schrodinger, Louis de Broglie, Werner Heisenberg contributed to the understanding of quantum phenomena such as wave-particle duality, quantum superposition, and entanglement. In 1927, Dirac proposed the theory of quantum electrodynamics, where photons are regarded as excitations of the electromagnetic field and interacted with charges. These advances established the foundations for a quantum description of photons. Yet, the deeper question of what distinguishes genuinely non-classical light from classical electromagnetic fields was resolved only much later, with the advent of quantum optics.

Modern quantum optics was born with Hanburry Brown and Twiss experiment in 1956, which studied correlations of intensity fluctuation leading to the understanding of photon bunching. Roy Glauber introduced his theory of quantum optics to look for genuine quantum optical phenomena in 1963. Few more notable quantum optical experiments are the Bell experiments (1982) proving nonlocality, Hong–Ou–Mandel effect showing interference arising from indistinguishability of photons (1987), Franson interferometry (1989) exploring time-energy entanglement and nonlocality. These experiments have been carried out with single or two photons.

In 1989, Daniel Greenberger, Michael Horne and Anton Zeilinger (GHZ) first proposed a three photon interference experiment, which is an extension of the EPR experiments, and predicted a three photon interferometric quantum effect, which is distinct from two photon cases. Recently, GHZ interferometry has been experimentally realized in 2017. Another aspect of multi photon quantum interference - has been recently realized in a recent experiment at the same time. This is a generalization of the Hong–Ou–Mandel effect, the interference due to indistinguishability of photons - to three photons.

== Agne experiment ==
The experiment carried out by Agne et al. demonstrates a GHZ-type three-photon interference effect. In GHZ interferometry, one prepares an entangled Greenberger–Horne–Zeilinger (GHZ) state of three photons, in which all photons coherently occupy one of two possible paths. A controllable phase shift is applied to one of these paths. The three photons are then detected in coincidence, and the triple-coincidence rate varies sinusoidally with the applied phase, producing a characteristic interference pattern. Importantly, this three-photon interferometer isolates genuine three-photon interference: it exhibits no two-photon correlations, making the observed modulation a direct signature of tripartite quantum coherence.

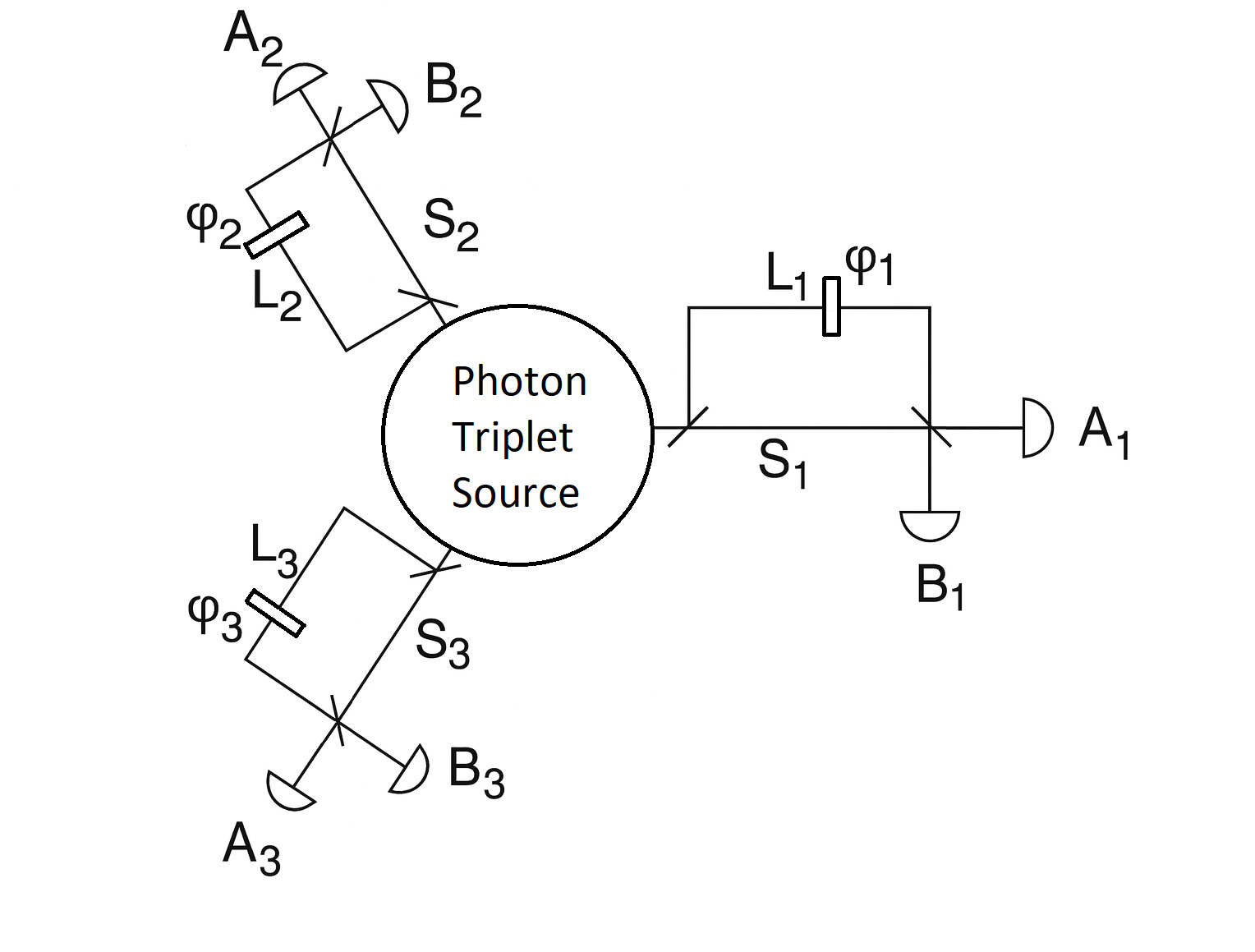
Schematic Diagram of Three Photon GHZ type Franson Interferometer

The experiment is implemented using a photon-triplet source combined with a generalized Franson interferometer to obtain entangled states via post-selection. The three photons produced by the triplet source are sent through an unbalanced interferometer, consisting of a short arm S and a long arm L that introduces a controllable phase shift $\varphi$. By post selecting three photon coincidences using detectors A or B, one can obtain entangled three photon states. For example, if three photons are detected simultaneously at the detectors, all of them must have taken either the short path S_{1}S_{2}S_{3}, or the longer path L_{1}L_{2}L_{3}. The post-selected state is therefore a coherent superposition of these two path configurations.

Qualitative pattern of two and three photon coincidences as a function of phase

As each photon acquires a phase shift along the long path of the interferometer, the three-photon coincidence probability depends on the sum of these phase shifts. The resulting three photon coincidence probability is $P_3=\frac{1}{2}(1\pm cos\varphi)$ where $\varphi=\varphi_1+\varphi_2+\varphi_3$. The sign depends on the specific triple-detection pattern: the minus sign corresponds to the "AAA set of outcomes and the plus sign corresponds to the "BBB set. These sets group the possible detector combinations that yield three-photon coincidences: AAA = {A_{1}A_{2}A_{3}, A_{1}B_{2}B_{3}, B_{1}A_{2}B_{3}, B_{1}B_{2}A_{3}} and BBB = {B_{1}B_{2}B_{3}, A_{1}A_{2}B_{3}, B_{1}A_{2}A_{3}, A_{1}B_{2}A_{3}}.

Remarkably, while the triple-coincidence rate depends sinusoidally on the total phase $\varphi$, all single-photon and two-photon coincidence rates remain constant and show no phase dependence. This invariance indicates that only the three-photon amplitudes interfere, providing a clear signature of genuine three-photon interference. Agne et al. experimentally verified this behavior: the three-photon coincidence rates exhibit sinusoidal modulation as a function of total phase, whereas the two-photon coincidences and single photon detections show no measurable variation.

== Menssen experiment ==
Menssen et al. investigated three-photon interference from a different perspective—namely, interference arising from indistinguishability of photons. Their experiment extends the well-known Hong–Ou–Mandel (HOM) effect to the case of three photons. In the standard HOM effect, the two-photon coincidence rate drops to zero when the photons arrive simultaneously at a beam splitter, i.e., when they are perfectly indistinguishable. Indistinguishability results into a coherent superposition of all possible paths through the beam splitter, and the interference among these amplitudes eliminates the probability of observing a two-photon coincidence. When the photons do not overlap perfectly in time, they become partially distinguishable, and the destructive interference is incomplete—resulting in the characteristic HOM dip.

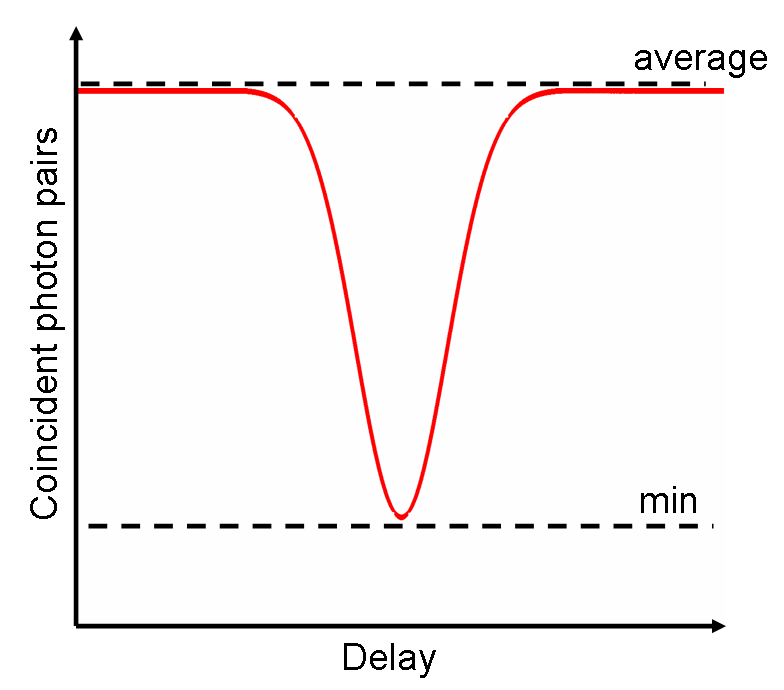
The "HOM dip" of coincident counts in the detectors versus relative delay between single-photon wave packets.

In the experiment of Menssen et al., it was shown that for three photons, the coincidence rate exhibits an interference effect analogous to the HOM dip, arising from partial distinguishability. However, unlike the two-photon case, the resulting interference pattern depends on a uniquely three-photon quantity known as the triad phase, which has no analogue in standard HOM interference. Furthermore, in the same experimental configuration, all two-photon coincidences remain flat and show no interference. This absence of lower-order interference, combined with the triad-phase dependence of the three-photon signal, provides a clear signature of genuinely tripartite interference.

To achieve this, Menssen et al. utilized both temporal and polarization modes of the photons. In their scheme, the photons may arrive with perfect temporal overlap, yet still remain distinguishable through their polarization degrees of freedom. The initial single-photon states are prepared as

$|\psi_i\rangle=|t_i\rangle\otimes(\cos\alpha_i|H\rangle+e^{i\eta_i}\sin\alpha_i|V\rangle)$

where $t_i$ denotes a controllable time delay for the arrival of i-th photon, and the second factor represents an arbitrary polarization state expressed in the horizontal and vertical polarization basis. By appropriately choosing $\alpha_i$, $\eta_i$, and $t_i$ the photons can be prepared in specific polarization states and at arbitrary times.

The three photons are then sent into a tritter, which is the three-port generalization of a balanced beam splitter. A tritter mixes the three spatial modes symmetrically and is described by the unitary transformation in the $|\psi_i\rangle$ basis,

$\left.U_{\mathrm{tritter}}=\frac{1}{\sqrt{3}}\left( \begin{array} {ccc}1 & 1 & 1 \\ 1 & \zeta^2 & \zeta \\ 1 & \zeta & \zeta^2 \end{array}\right.\right),$ $\zeta=e^{2\pi i /3}$.

The photons are then detected, and the three photon coincidence probability is given by

$P_{111}=\frac{1}{9}[2+4r_{12}r_{23}r_{31}\cos(\varphi)-r_{12}^2-r_{23}^2-r_{31}^2]$

and the two photon coincidence probability is

$P_{11}=\frac{1}{9}(2-r_{ij}^{2})$

where $\langle\psi_i|\psi_j \rangle=r_{ij}e^{i\phi_{ij}}$ and $\phi=\phi_{12}+\phi_{23}+\phi_{31}$. The phase differences between the three photons sum up to a quantity labeled the triad phase $\phi$. The three photon coincidence have explicit dependence on the triad phase, in addition to temporal overlap. However, the two photon coincidence is independent of the triad phase.

Schematic of HOM dip as a function of time delay for the three-photon case. The pattern is dependent on the triad phase, unlike the two photon case.

Menssen et al. experimentally confirmed the HOM-like interference pattern for three photons by varying the relative time delay $\tau$ of two photons symmetrically with respect to the third photon, i.e., $t_1=t_2-\tau/2$ and $t_3=t_2+\tau/2$ for two different values of the triad phase,$\phi=0,\pi$. As the time delay $\tau$ is increased, the interference patterns diminish due to loss of indistinguishability, analogous to the two-photon Hong–Ou–Mandel effect. In addition, the observed patterns exhibit a clear dependence on the triad phase, highlighting the uniquely three-photon character of the interference.

Schematic of three-photon coincidence showing a dependence on the triad phase, whereas two-photon coincidence remains constant.

In a second experiment, Menssen et al. demonstrated that when $r_{ij}$ is kept constant, the three photon coincidence rate vary sinusoidally as a function of the triad phase $\phi$ , while the two photon coincidence rates remain constant. This behavior provides a clear signature of genuine three-photon interference.

== See also ==
- Hong–Ou–Mandel effect
- Hanbury Brown and Twiss effect
- Bell test
