= Hideo Mabuchi =

American physicist

- Born: 1971 (age 54–55)
- Education: Princeton University; California Institute of Technology
- Known for: Quantum feedback
- Awards: MacArthur Fellow (2000)
- Scientific career
- Doctoral advisor: H. Jeff Kimble

Hideo Mabuchi (born 1971) is a physicist and Professor of Applied Physics at Stanford University, and the head of the Mabuchi Lab.

He graduated from Princeton University magna cum laude, with an A.B. in Physics in 1992, and from California Institute of Technology (Caltech) with a Ph.D. in Physics, in 1998, where he studied with H. Jeff Kimble.

He was a professor at Caltech from 1998 to 2007 (Assistant Professor of Physics, 1998–2001; Associate Professor of Physics and Control & Dynamical Systems, 2001–2007). Since 2007, he is a Professor of Applied Physics and Modern Thought and Literature (MTL) at Stanford.

== Awards ==
- 1999 TR100 Young Innovator
- 1999–2001 Sloan Research Fellowship
- 2000–2002 ONR Young Investigator
- 2000 MacArthur Fellow

== Works ==
- "Quantum feedback and the quantum-classical transition", Science and ultimate reality: quantum theory, cosmology, and complexity, Editors John D. Barrow, P. C. W. Davies, Charles L. Harper, Cambridge University Press, 2004, ISBN 978-0-521-83113-0
- Measurement and the quantum-classical transition, Metanexus Institute: 2002.
