= Higher order coherence =

Concept in quantum optics

In quantum optics, correlation functions are used to characterize the statistical and coherence properties – the ability of waves to interfere – of electromagnetic radiation, like optical light. Higher order coherence or n-th order coherence (for any positive integer n>1) extends the concept of coherence to quantum optics and coincidence experiments. It is used to differentiate between optics experiments that require a quantum mechanical description from those for which classical fields suffice.

Classical optical experiments like Young's double slit experiment and Mach-Zehnder interferometry are characterized only by the first order coherence. The 1956 Hanbury Brown and Twiss experiment brought to light a different kind of correlation between fields, namely the correlation of intensities, which correspond to second order coherences. Coherent waves have a well-defined constant phase relationship. Coherence functions, as introduced by Roy Glauber and others in the 1960s, capture the mathematics behind the intuition by defining correlation between the electric field components as coherence. These correlations between electric field components can be measured to arbitrary orders, hence leading to the concept of different orders or degrees of coherence.

Orders of coherence can be measured using classical correlation functions or by using the quantum analogue of those functions, which take quantum mechanical description of electric field operators as input. The underlying mechanism and description of the physical processes are fundamentally different because quantum interference deals with interference of possible histories while classical interference deals with interference of physical waves.

Analogous considerations apply to other wave-like systems. For example the case of Bose–Einstein correlations in condensed matter physics.

== Introduction ==
=== First order coherence ===
The normalized first order correlation function is written as:

$$\gamma ^{(1)}( \mathbf{r}_1, t_1;\mathbf{r}_2, t_2) =
\frac{\left\langle E^*(\mathbf{r}_1, t_1) E(\mathbf{r}_2, t_2) \right\rangle}
{\left[ \left\langle\left| E(\mathbf{r}_1, t_1) \right|^2 \right\rangle \left\langle \left| E(\mathbf{r}_2, t_2) \right|^2 \right\rangle \right]^\frac{1}{2}},$$

where $\langle \cdots \rangle$ denotes a (statistical) ensemble average. For non-stationary states, such as pulses, the ensemble is made up of many pulses. When one deals with ergodic processes, the ensemble average can be replaced with a time average. If we restrict ourselves to plane parallel to each other waves then $\mathbf{r}=z$.

In this case, the result for stationary states will not depend on $t_1$, but on the time delay $\tau=t_1-t_2$ (or $\tau=t_1-t_2+\frac{z_1-z_2}{c}$ if $z_1 \ne z_2$).

This allows us to write a simplified form

$$\gamma^{(1)}( \tau)= \frac{\left \langle E^*(t)E(t+\tau) \right \rangle}{\left \langle\left | E(t)\right |^2 \right \rangle },$$

where we have now averaged over t.

This is a plot of the absolute value of g^{(1)} as a function of the delay normalized to the coherence length τ/τ_{c}. The blue curve is for a coherent state (an ideal laser or a single frequency). The red curve is for Lorentzian chaotic light (e.g. collision broadened). The green curve is for Gaussian chaotic light (e.g. Doppler broadened).

In optical interferometers such as the Michelson interferometer, Mach–Zehnder interferometer, or Sagnac interferometer, one splits an electric field into two components, introduces a time delay to one of the components, and then recombines them. The intensity of resulting field is measured as a function of the time delay. In this specific case involving two equal input intensities, the visibility of the resulting interference pattern is given by:

$$\begin{align}
\nu &= \left| \gamma^{(1)}(\tau) \right| \\
\nu &= \left| \gamma^{(1)}(\mathbf{r}_1, t_1; \mathbf{r}_2, t_2) \right|
\end{align}$$

where the second expression involves combining two space-time points from a field. The visibility ranges from zero, for incoherent electric fields, to one, for coherent electric fields. Anything in between is described as partially coherent.

Generally, $\gamma ^{(1)}(0) = 1$ and $\gamma ^{(1)}(\tau) = \gamma^{(1)}(-\tau)^*$.

For light of a single frequency (of a point source):

$$\gamma^{(1)}(\tau) = e^{-i\omega_0\tau}$$

For Lorentzian chaotic light (e.g. collision broadened):

$$\gamma^{(1)}(\tau) = e^{-i\omega_0\tau-\frac{|\tau|}{\tau_c}}$$

For Gaussian chaotic light (e.g. Doppler broadened):

$$\gamma^{(1)}(\tau) = e^{-i\omega_0\tau-\frac{\pi}{2}\left(\frac{\tau}{\tau_c}\right)^2}$$

Here, $\omega_0$ is the central frequency of the light and $\tau_c$ is the coherence time of the light.

==== Classical description of the double slit experiment ====
Figure 1. Schematic diagram for the setup of the Young's Double Slit Experiment.

In the double slit experiment, originally by Thomas Young in 1801, light from a light source is allowed to pass through two pinholes separated by some distance, and a screen is placed some distance away from the pinholes where the interference between the light waves is observed (Figure. 1). Young's double slit experiment demonstrates the dependence of interference on coherence, specifically on the first-order correlation. This experiment is equivalent to the Mach–Zehnder interferometer with the caveat that Young's double slit experiment is concerned with spatial coherence, while the Mach–Zehnder interferometer relies on temporal coherence.

The intensity measured at the position $\mathbf{r}$ at time $t$ is

$$\langle I \rangle = \langle |E^+(\mathbf{r},t)|^2 \rangle = \langle I \rangle =I_1 + I_2 + 2 \sqrt{I_1 I_2} |\gamma^{(1)}(x_1,x_2)| \cos{\phi(x_1,x_2)}$$.

Light field has highest degree of coherence when the corresponding interference pattern has the maximum contrast on the screen. The fringe contrast is defined as $V = \frac{I_{\rm max} - I_{\rm min}}{I_{\rm max} + I_{\rm min}}$.

Classically, $I^{\rm max}_{\rm min} = I_1 + I_2 \pm 2 \sqrt{I_1 I_2} |\gamma^{(1)}(x_1,x_2)|$ and hence $V = \frac{2 \sqrt{I_1 I_2}|\gamma^{(1)}(x_1,x_2)|}{I_1 + I_2}$. As coherence is the ability to interfere visibility and coherence are linked:

$|\gamma^{(1)}(x_1,x_2)| = 1$ means highest contrast, complete coherence
$0 < |\gamma^{(1)}(x_1,x_2)| < 1$ means partial fringe visibility, partial coherence
$|\gamma^{(1)}(x_1,x_2)| = 0$ means no contrast, complete incoherence.

==== Quantum description of the double slit experiment ====
Classically, the electric field at a position $\mathbf{r}$, is the sum of electric field components from the two pinholes at $\mathbf{r}_1$ and $\mathbf{r}_2$ earlier times $t_1, t_2$ respectably i.e. $E^+(\mathbf{r},t) = E^+(\mathbf{r_1},t_1) + E^+(\mathbf{r}_2,t_2)$. Correspondingly, in the quantum description the electric field operators are similarly related, $\hat{E}^+(\mathbf{r},t) = \hat{E}^+(\mathbf{r_1},t_1) + \hat{E}^+(\mathbf{r}_2,t_2)$. This implies

$$I = \mathrm{Tr}[\rho \hat{E}^-(\mathbf{r},t) \hat{E}^+(\mathbf{r},t)] = I_1 + I_2 + 2 \sqrt{I_1 I_2} |g^{(1)}(x_1,x_2)| \cos \phi(x_1,x_2)$$.

The intensity fluctuates as a function of position i.e. the quantum mechanical treatment also predicts interference fringes. Moreover, in accordance to the intuitive understanding of coherence i.e. ability to interfere, the interference patterns depend on the first-order correlation function $g^{(1)}$. Comparing this to the classical intensity, we note that the only difference is that the classical normalized correlation $\gamma^{(1)}$ is now replaced by the quantum correlation $g^{(1)}$. Even the computations here look strikingly similar to the ones that might be done classically. However, the quantum interference that occurs in this process is fundamentally different from the classical interference of electromagnetic waves. Quantum interference occurs when two possible histories, given a particular initial and final state, interfere. In this experiment, given an initial state of the photon before the pinhole and it final state at the screen, the two possible histories correspond to the two pinholes through which the photon could have passed. Hence, quantum mechanically, here the photon is interfering with itself. Such interference of different histories, however, occurs only when the observer has no specific way of determining which of the different histories actually occurred. If the system is observed to determine the path of the photon, then on average the interference of amplitudes will vanish.

=== Second-order coherence ===
Plot of g^{(2)} as a function of the delay normalized to the coherence length τ/τ_{c}. The blue curve is for a coherent state (an ideal laser or a single frequency). The red curve is for Lorentzian chaotic light (e.g. collision broadened). The green curve is for Gaussian chaotic light (e.g. Doppler broadened). The chaotic light is super-Poissonian and bunched.

The normalised second order correlation function is written as:

$$g^{(2)}( \mathbf{r}_1,t_1;\mathbf{r}_2,t_2) = \frac{\left \langle E^*(\mathbf{r}_1,t_1)E^*(\mathbf{r}_2,t_2)E(\mathbf{r}_2,t_2)E(\mathbf{r}_1,t_1) \right \rangle}{\left \langle\left | E(\mathbf{r}_1,t_1)\right |^2 \right \rangle \left \langle \left |E(\mathbf{r}_2,t_2)\right |^2 \right \rangle }$$.

Note that this is not a generalization of the first-order coherence.

If the electric fields are considered classical, we can reorder them to express $g^{(2)}$ in terms of intensities. A plane parallel wave in a stationary state will have

$$g^{(2)}(\tau)= \frac{\left \langle I(t)I(t + \tau) \right \rangle}{\left \langle I(t) \right \rangle^2 }$$.

The above expression is even, $g^{(2)}(\tau)= g^{(2)}(-\tau)$. For classical fields, one can apply the Cauchy–Schwarz inequality to the intensities in the above expression (since they are real numbers) to show that $g^{(2)}(\tau) \le g^{(2)}(0)$. The inequality $\left\langle I(t) I(t) \right\rangle - {\left\langle I(t) \right\rangle}^2 = \left\langle {\left[ I(t) - \left\langle I(t) \right\rangle \right]}^2 \right\rangle \geq 0$ shows that $1 \le g^{(2)}(0) \le \infty$. Assuming independence of intensities when $\tau \to +\infty$ leads to $g^{(2)}(+\infty) = 1$. Nevertheless, the second-order coherence for an average over fringes of complementary interferometer outputs of a coherent state is only 0.5 (even though $g^{(2)} = 1$ for each output). And $g^{(2)}$ (calculated from averages) can be reduced down to zero with a proper discriminating trigger level applied to the signal (within the range of coherence).

Light is said to be bunched if $g^{(2)}(\tau) < g^{(2)}(0)$ and antibunched if $g^{(2)}(\tau) > g^{(2)}(0)$.

Chaotic light of all kinds (Lorentzian- or Gaussian-broadened) is bunched, following the Siegert relation $g^{(2)}(\tau) = 1 + \left| g^{(1)}(\tau) \right|^2$. Note the Hanbury Brown and Twiss effect uses this fact to find $\left| g^{(1)}(\tau) \right|$ from a measurement of $g^{(2)}(\tau)$. The bunching of chaotic light can be thought of as coming from temporal variations in emission probability due to stimulated emission. That is, once a photon is emitted spontaneously, it must travel through the emitting medium before radiating into the far field. During this brief transit, it can cause stimulated emission in other excited states, leading to a higher probability of photons being coherently emitted with near-zero time delay, i.e., a peak in $g^{(1)}(\tau)$ at $\tau=0$.

For light of a single frequency: $g^{(2)}(\tau) = 1$. Thus, laser light is neither bunched nor anti-bunched.

In the case of photon antibunching, for $\tau = 0$ we have $g^{(2)}(0) = 0$ for a single photon source because

$g^{(2)}(0)= \frac{\left\langle n(n - 1) \right\rangle}{\left\langle n \right\rangle^2},$

where $n$ is the photon number observable.

== Generalization ==
The electric field $E(\mathbf{r},t)$ can be separated into its positive and negative frequency components $E(\mathbf{r},t) = E^+(\mathbf{r},t) + E^-(\mathbf{r},t)$. Either of the two frequency components, contains all the physical information about the wave. The classical first-order, second order and n-th order correlation function are defined as follows

$$G_c^{(1)}(x_1, x_2) = \langle E^-(x_1) E^+(x_2) \rangle$$,
$$G_c^{(2)}(x_1, x_2, x_3, x_4) = \langle E^-(x_1) E^-(x_2) E^+(x_3) E^+(x_4) \rangle$$,
$$G_c^{(n)}(x_1,x_2,...,x_{2n}) = \langle E^-(x_1) ... E^-(x_n)E^+(x_{n+1}) ... E^+(x_{2n}) \rangle$$,

where $x_i$ represents $(\mathbf{r}_i, t_i)$. While the order of the $E^+(\mathbf{r},t)$ and $E^-(\mathbf{r},t)$, does not matter in the classical case, as they are merely numbers and hence commute, the ordering is vital in the quantum analogue of these correlation functions. The first order correlation function, measured at the same time and position gives us the intensity i.e. $G_c^{(1)}(x_1, x_1) = I$. The classical nth order normalized correlation function is defined by dividing the n-th order correlation function by all corresponding intensities:

$\gamma^{(n)}(x_1,...,x_n;x_n,...,x_1) = \frac{G_c^{(n)}(x_1,...,x_n;x_n,...,x_1)}{G_c^{(1)}(x_1,x_1)...G_c^{(1)}(x_n,x_n)}$.

=== Quantum description ===
In quantum mechanics, the positive and negative frequency components of the electric field are replaced by the operators $\hat{E}^+$ and $\hat{E}^-$ respectively. In the Heisenberg picture,

$\hat{E}^+ = i \sum\limits_{\mathbf{k},\mu} \sqrt{\frac{\hbar \omega_k}{2 \epsilon_0 V}} \hat{a}_{\mathbf{k},\mu} e^{i \mathbf{k}.\mathbf{r}} \mathbf{e}_{\mathbf{k},\mu}$,

where $\mathbf{k}$ is the polarization vector, $\mathbf{e}_{\mathbf{k},\mu}$ is the unit vector perpendicular to $\mathbf{k}$, with $\mu$ signifying one of the two vectors that are perpendicular to the polarization vector, $\omega_k$ is the frequency of the mode and $V$ is the volume. The n-th order quantum correlation function is defined as:

$$G^{(n)}(x_1,...,x_{2n}) = \mathrm{Tr}[\hat{\rho} \hat{E}^{-}(x_1) ... \hat{E}^{-}(x_n) \hat{E}^{+}(x_{n+1}) ... \hat{E}^{+}(x_{2n})]$$.

The ordering of the $\hat{E}^+$ and $\hat{E}^-$ operators do matter. This is because the positive and the negative frequency ($\hat{E}^+$ and $\hat{E}^-$) components are proportional the annihilation and the creation operators respectively, and $\hat{a}$ and $\hat{a}^{\dagger}$ do not commute. When the operators are written in the order shown in the equation above, they are said to be in a normal ordering. Subsequently, the n-th order normalized correlation function is defined as:

$g^{(n)}(x_1,...,x_n;x_n,...,x_1) = \frac{G^{(n)}(x_1,...,x_n;x_n,...,x_1)}{G^{(1)}(x_1,x_1)...G^{(1)}(x_n,x_n)}$.

A field is said to m-th order coherent if the m-th normalized correlation function is unity. This definition holds for both $\gamma^{(m)}$ and $g^{(m)}$.

== Examples ==
=== Hanbury Brown and Twiss experiment ===
Figure 2. A schematic diagram for the setup for Hanbury Brown and Twiss's original experiment.

In the Hanbury Brown and Twiss experiment (Figure 2.), a light beam is split using a beam splitter and then detected by detectors, which are equidistant from the beam splitter. Subsequently, signal measured by the second detector is delayed by time $\tau$ and the coincidence rate between the original and delayed signal is counted. This experiment correlates intensities, $|E^+(\mathbf{r},t + \tau)E^+(\mathbf{r},t)|^2$, rather than electric fields and hence measures the second order correlation function

$$G_c^{(2)}(t,t+\tau, t + \tau, t) = \langle E^-(t) E^-(t + \tau) E^+(t + \tau) E^+(t)\rangle$$.
Under the assumption of stationary statistics, at a given position, the normalized correlation function is
$$g^{(2)}= \frac{\langle \hat{E}^-(0) \hat{E}^-(\tau) \hat{E}^+(\tau) \hat{E}^+(0) \rangle}{ \langle \hat{E}^-(0) \hat{E}^+(0) \rangle \langle \hat{E}^-(\tau) \hat{E}^+(\tau) \rangle}$$.

$g^{(2)}$ here measures the probability of coincidence of two photons being detected with a time difference $\tau$.

For all varieties of chaotic light, the following relationship between the first order and second-order coherences holds:

$g^{(2)}(\tau) = 1 + |g^{(1)}(\tau)|^2$.

This relationship is true for both the classical and quantum correlation functions. Moreover, as $|g^{(1)}(\tau)|$ always takes a value between 0 and 1, for a chaotic light beam, $1\leq g^{(2)}\leq 2$. The light source used by Hanbury Brown and Twiss was stellar light which is chaotic. Hanbury Brown and Twiss used this result to compute the first order coherence from their measurement of the second order coherence. The observed second order coherence the curve was as shown in figure 2.

For Gaussian light source $g^{(1)} = e^{-i \omega_0 \tau -\frac{\pi}{2}(\frac{\tau}{\tau_0})^2}$. Often a Gaussian light source is chaotic and consequently,

Figure 3. The second order coherence for stellar light as measured in the Hanbury Brown and Twiss experiment as a function of the time delay introduced between the signals $\tau / \tau_0$, where $\tau_0$ is the coherence length.

$g^{(2)}(\tau) = 1 + e^{-\frac{\pi}{2}(\frac{\tau}{\tau_0})^2}$.

This model fits the observation that was done by Hanbury Brown and Twiss using stellar light as demonstrated in figure 3. If thermal light was used instead of stellar light in the same setup, then we would see a different function for the second order coherence. Thermal light can be modeled to be a Lorentzian power spectrum centered around frequency $\omega_0$, which means $\langle E^*(0) E(\tau) \rangle = E_0^2 e^{-|\tau|/\tau_0}$, where $\tau_0$ is the coherence length of the beam. Correspondingly, $g^{(1)} = e^{-i \omega_0 \tau -|\tau|/\tau_0}$ and $g^{(2)}(\tau) = 1 + e^{-2 |\tau|/ \tau_0}$. The second-order coherence for stellar (Gaussian), thermal (Lorentzian) and coherent light is shown in Figure 4.

When chaotic light is first-order coherent, i.e. $g^{(1)}(0)=1$, then $g^{(2)}(0)=2$, meaning the light is second-order incoherent. On the other hand, light from a traditional laser source has both first-order and second-order coherence. Note that in principle, a light field with an arbitrary spectrum that is coherent to all orders can exist.

==== Quantum description ====
Classically, we can think of a light beam as having a probability distribution as a function of mode amplitudes, $P(\{ \alpha_k \})$ and in that case, the second order correlation function

$G^{(2)}(\tau,0) = \langle E^-(\tau)E^+(\tau)E^-(0)E^+(0)\rangle = \int P(\{ \alpha_k \}) E^*(\tau)E(\tau)E^*(0)E(0) d\{ \alpha_k \}$.

If we assume that the quantum state of the setup is

$\rho = \int d\{ \alpha_k \} P(\{ \alpha_k \}) |\{ \alpha_k \} \rangle \langle \{ \alpha_k \}|$,

then the quantum mechanical correlation function,

$G^{(2)}(\tau,0) = Tr[ \rho \hat{E}^-(\tau)\hat{E}^+(\tau)\hat{E}^-(0)\hat{E}^+(0)]= \int P(\{ \alpha_k \}) E^*(\tau)E(\tau)E^*(0)E(0) d\{ \alpha_k \}$,

which is same as the classical result.

Figure 4. The second order coherence for thermal, stellar and coherent light as a function of time delay. $\tau_0$ is the coherence length of the light beam.

Similar to the case of Young's double slit experiment, the classical and the quantum description lead to the same result, but that does not mean that two descriptions are equivalent. Classically, the light beams arrives as an electromagnetic wave and interferes owing to the superposition principle. The quantum description is not as straightforward. To understand the subtleties in the quantum description, assume that photons from the source are emitted independently of each other at the source and that the photons are not split by the beam splitter. When the intensity of the source is set to be very low, such that only one photon might be detected at any time, accounting for the fact that there might be accidental coincidences, which are statistically independent of time, the coincidence counter should not change with respect to the time difference. However, as shown in Figure 3., for stellar light $g^{(2)}(\tau) = 1 + e^{-2 |\tau|/ \tau_0}$, so without any time delay $g^{(2)}(0) = 2$ and with a large time delay $\lim_{\tau \rightarrow \infty}g^{(2)}(\tau) = 1$. Hence, even when there was no time-delay the photons from the source were arriving in pairs! This effect is termed photon bunching. Moreover, if a laser light was used at the source instead of chaotic light, then second order coherence would be independent of the time delay. HBT's experiment allows for a fundamental distinction in the way in which photons are emitted from a laser compared to a natural light source. Such a distinction is not captured by the classical description on wave interference.

== Mathematical properties ==
For the purposes of standard optical experiments, coherence is just first-order coherence and higher-order coherences are generally ignored. Higher order coherences are measured in photon-coincidence counting experiments. Correlation interferometry uses coherences of fourth-order and higher to perform stellar measurements. We can think of $G^{(n)}(x_1,...,x_n;x_n,...,x_1)$ as the average coincidence rate of detecting $n$ photons at $x_1,...,x_n$ positions. Physically, these rate are always positive and therefore $G^{(n)}(x_1,...,x_n;x_n,...,x_1) \geq 0$.

=== m-th order coherent fields ===
A field is called mth order coherent if there exists a function $E(x)$ such that all correlation functions for $n < m$ factorize. Notationally, this means

$$G^{(n)}(x_1,...,x_{2n}) = \prod\limits_{j=1}^{n} E^*(j)E^*(j+1)$$.

This factorizability of all $n<m$ correlation functions implies that $|G^{(n)}(x_1,...,x_{2n})|^2 = \prod\limits_{j=1}^{2n} G^{(1)}(x_j,x_j)$. As $g^{(n)}(x_1,...,x_{2n})$ was defined to be $\frac{G^{(n)}(x_1,...,x_n;x_n,...,x_1)}{\prod\limits_{j=1}^{n} G^{(1)}(x_j,x_j)}$, it follows that $|g^{(n)}(x_1,...,x_{2n})|=1$ for $n<m$, if the field is m-coherent. For a m-coherent field, the $m$ photons being detected will be detected statistically independent of each other.

=== Upper bounds ===
Given an upper bound on how many photons can be present in the field, there is an upper bound on the Mth coherence the field can have. This is because $\hat{E}^+$ is proportional the annihilation operator. To see this, begin with a mixed state for the field $\sum\limits_{n,m} c_{n,m} | n \rangle \langle m |$. If this sum has an upper limit on n, m i.e. $M > n,m$, $\mathrm{Tr}[\rho \hat{E}^+(x_1)...\hat{E}^+(x_p)]$ is proportional to

$$\mathrm{Tr}[\sum\limits_{n,m} c_{n,m} \hat{a}...(\text{p times})...\hat{a} |n \rangle \langle m| ] = \sum\limits_{n,m} c_{n,m} \langle m|\hat{a}...(\text{p times})...\hat{a} |n \rangle =0$$

for $p > m$. This result would be unintuitive in a classical description, but fortunately such a case has no classical counterpart because we cannot put an upper bound on the number of photons in the classical case.

=== Stationarity of the statistics ===
When dealing with classical optics, physicists often employ the assumption that the statistics of the system are stationary. This means that while the observations might fluctuate, the underlying statistics of the system remains constant as time progresses. The quantum analogue of stationary statistics is to require that the density operator, which contains the information about the wavefunction, commutes with the Hamiltonian. Owing to Schrödinger equation, $\frac{d \rho}{dt} = \frac{-i}{h}[H,\rho]$, stationary statistics implies that the density operator is independent of time. Consequently, in $G^{(n)}(x_1,...,x_{2n})$, owing to the cyclicity of the trace, we can transform the time independence of the density operator in the Schrödinger picture to the time independence of $\hat{E}^{+}$ and $\hat{E}^{-}$, in the Heisenberg picture, giving us

$G^{(n)}(x_1,...,x_{2n}) = \mathrm{Tr}[\hat{\rho} \hat{E}^{-}(x_1,t) .... \hat{E}^{-}(x_n,t) \hat{E}^{+}(x_{n+1},t) ...\hat{E}^{+}(x_{2n,t})]$ $= \mathrm{Tr}[\hat{\rho} \hat{E}^{-}(x_1,t+\tau) .... \hat{E}^{-}(x_n,t+\tau) \hat{E}^{+}(x_{n+1},t+\tau) ... \hat{E}^{+}(x_{2n},t+\tau)]$.

This means that under the assumption that the underlying statistics of the system are stationary, the nth order correlation functions do not change when every time argument is translated by the same amount. In other words, rather than looking at actual times, the correlation function is only concerned with the $2n-1$ time differences.

=== Coherent states ===
Coherent state are quantum mechanical states that have the maximal coherence and have the most "classical"-like behavior. A coherent state is defined as the quantum mechanical state that is the eigenstate of the electric field operator $\hat{E}^+$. As $\hat{E}^+$ is directly proportional to the annihilation operator the coherent state is an eigenstate of the annihilation operator. Given a coherent state $| \alpha \rangle$,

$$G^{(n)}(x_1,...,x_{2n}) = \mathrm{Tr}[\sum\limits_{n,m} c_{n,m} \hat{a}...\hat{a} | \alpha \rangle \langle \alpha| ] = \langle \alpha|\hat{a}...(\text{p times})...\hat{a} |\alpha \rangle = 1$$.

Consequently, coherent states have all orders of coherences as being non-zero.
