= Interferometric visibility =

Measure of interference in a wave system

The interferometric visibility (also known as interference visibility and fringe visibility, or just visibility when in context) is a measure of the contrast of interference in any system subject to wave superposition. Examples include as optics, quantum mechanics, water waves, sound waves, or electrical signals. Visibility is defined as the ratio of the amplitude of the interference pattern to the sum of the powers of the individual waves. The interferometric visibility gives a practical way to measure the coherence of two waves (or one wave with itself). A theoretical definition of the coherence is given by the degree of coherence, using the notion of correlation.

Generally, two or more waves are superimposed and as the phase difference between them varies, the power or intensity (probability or population in quantum mechanics) of the resulting wave oscillates, forming an interference pattern. The pointwise definition may be expanded to a visibility function varying over time or space. For example, the phase difference varies as a function of space in a two-slit experiment. Alternately, the phase difference may be manually controlled by the operator, for example by adjusting a vernier knob in an interferometer.

== Visibility in optics ==
In linear optical interferometers (like the Mach–Zehnder interferometer, Michelson interferometer, and Sagnac interferometer), interference manifests itself as intensity oscillations over time or space, also called fringes. Under these circumstances, the interferometric visibility is also known as the "Michelson visibility" or the "fringe visibility." For this type of interference, the sum of the intensities (powers) of the two interfering waves equals the average intensity over a given time or space domain. The visibility is written as:

$$\nu=A/\bar{I},$$

where $A$ is the amplitude envelope of the oscillating intensity and $\bar{I}$ is the average intensity, which can be calculated from the maximum and minimum intensities as follows:

$$A=(I_\max-I_\min)/2,$$
$$\bar{I}=(I_\max+I_\min)/2.$$

So it can be rewritten as:

$$\nu=\frac{I_\max-I_\min}{I_\max+I_\min},$$

where I_{max} is the maximum intensity of the oscillations and I_{min} the minimum intensity of the oscillations.

$$I_{max}=I_{1} + I_{2}+2*\sqrt{I_{1}*I_{2}}*| \gamma |,$$

$$I_{min}=I_{1} + I_{2}-2*\sqrt{I_{1}*I_{2}}*| \gamma |,$$

If the two optical fields are ideally monochromatic (consist of only single wavelength) point sources of the same polarization, then the predicted visibility will be

$$\nu=\frac{2\sqrt{I_1 I_2}| \gamma |}{I_1+I_2},$$

where $I_1$ and $I_2$ indicate the intensity of the respective wave. $\gamma$ indicates the phase relationship of the original electric field. Any dissimilarity between the optical fields will decrease the visibility from the ideal. In this sense, the visibility is a measure of the coherence between two optical fields. A theoretical definition for this is given by the degree of coherence. This definition of interference directly applies to the interference of water waves and electric signals.

=== Examples ===
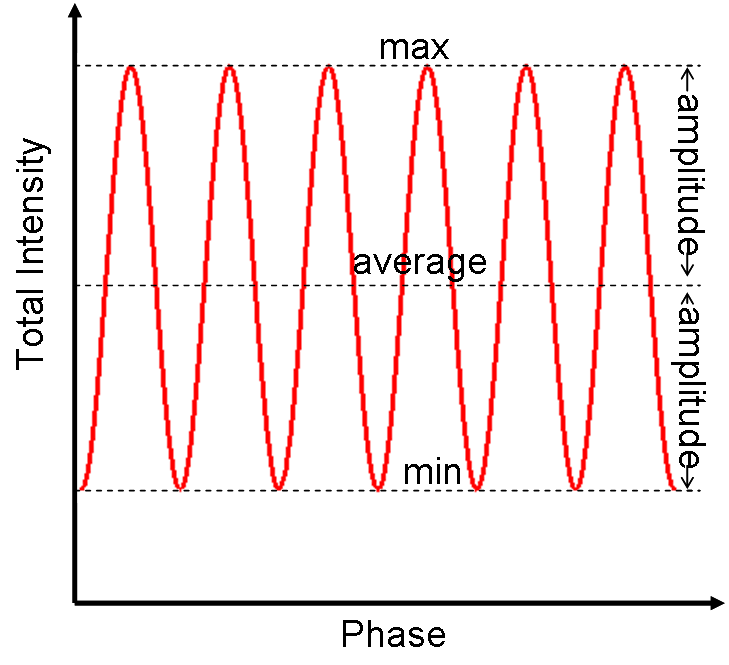
Visibility in a Mach–Zehnder interferometer is constant.

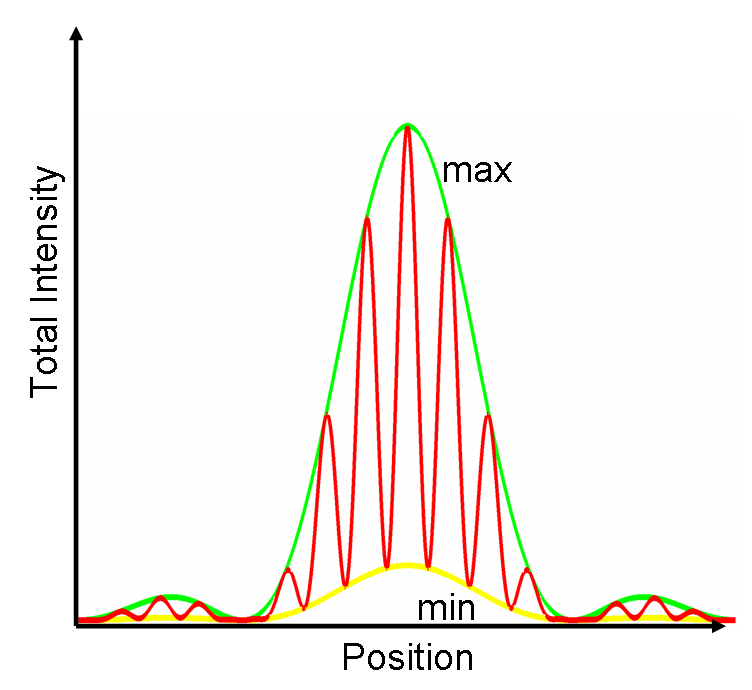
Visibility in this double-slit interference is maximum (80%) at the center.

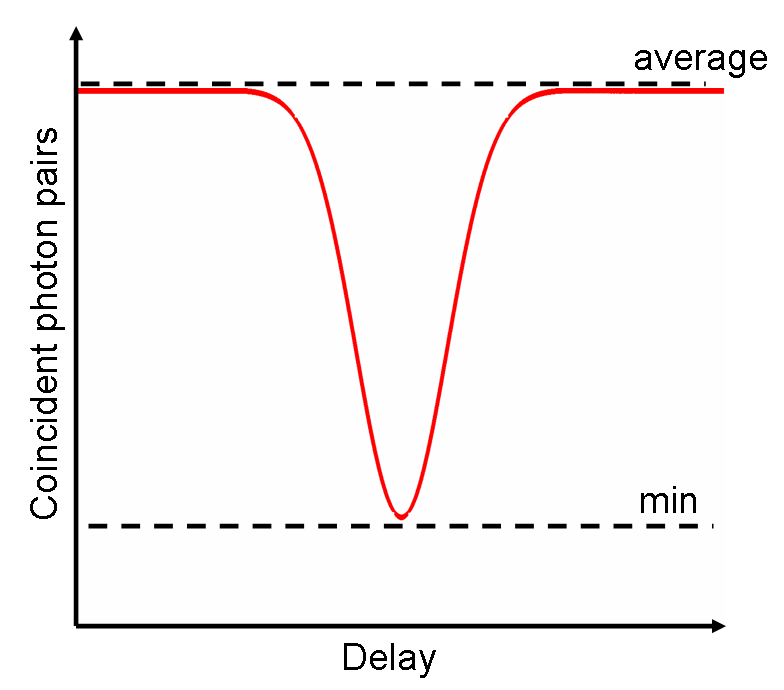
Visibility in Hong–Ou–Mandel interference. At large delays the photons do not interfere. At zero delays, the detection of coincident photon pairs is suppressed.

== Visibility in quantum mechanics ==
Since the Schrödinger equation is a wave equation and all objects can be considered waves in quantum mechanics, interference is ubiquitous. Some examples: Bose–Einstein condensates can exhibit interference fringes. Atomic populations show interference in a Ramsey interferometer. Photons, atoms, electrons, neutrons, and molecules have exhibited interference in double-slit interferometers.

== See also ==
- Degree of coherence
- Interferometry
- Optical interferometry
- List of types of interferometers
- Hong–Ou–Mandel effect
