= Mandel Q parameter =

The Mandel Q parameter measures the departure of the occupation number distribution from Poissonian statistics. It was introduced in quantum optics by Leonard Mandel. It is a convenient way to characterize non-classical states with negative values indicating a sub-Poissonian statistics, which have no classical analog. Denoting by $\Delta \hat{n} := \hat{n} - \langle \hat{n} \rangle$ the (operator-valued) photon-number fluctuation, the Mandel Q parameter is defined as the normalized variance of the boson distribution:

$$Q=\frac{\left \langle (\Delta \hat{n})^2 \right \rangle - \langle \hat{n} \rangle}{\langle \hat{n} \rangle} = \frac{\langle \hat{n}^{2} \rangle - \langle \hat{n} \rangle^2}{\langle \hat{n} \rangle} -1 = \langle \hat{n} \rangle \left(g^{(2)}(0)-1 \right)$$

where $\hat{n}$ is the photon number operator and $g^{(2)}$ is the normalized second-order correlation function as defined by Glauber. Note that $\Delta \hat{n}$ denotes the fluctuation operator itself, not the (scalar) standard deviation of the photon number, which is instead given by $\sqrt{\langle (\Delta \hat{n})^2 \rangle}$.

== Non-classical value ==
Negative values of Q corresponds to state which variance of photon number is less than the mean (equivalent to sub-Poissonian statistics). In this case, the phase space distribution cannot be interpreted as a classical probability distribution.

$$-1\leq Q < 0  \Leftrightarrow 0\leq  \langle (\Delta \hat{n})^2  \rangle \leq \langle \hat{n} \rangle$$

The minimal value $Q=-1$ is obtained for photon number states (Fock states), which by definition have a well-defined number of photons and for which $\langle (\Delta \hat{n})^2 \rangle = 0$.

== Examples ==
For black-body radiation, the phase-space functional is Gaussian. The resulting occupation distribution of the number state is characterized by a Bose–Einstein statistics for which $Q=\langle n\rangle$. Coherent states have a Poissonian photon-number statistics for which $Q=0$.
