= Lumbay ng Dila =

Novel by Genevieve L. Asenjo

Lumbay ng Dila (Tongue's Melancholy) is a novel written by Filipino author Genevieve L. Asenjo published in 2010. The novel is set mainly in Antique in the Western Visayas region of the Philippines and it tells the story of Sadyah Zapanta – Lopez. It received a special citation for Excellence in Fiction in a Philippine Language in the Juan C. Laya Prize in the 2011 Philippine National Book Awards.

== Summary ==
The novel tells the story of Sadyah Zapanta – Lopez, the granddaughter of Marcelo N. Lopez and the daughter of Leandro and Teresa Lopez. Marcelo N. Lopez was imprisoned after being accused as the mastermind of the Guinsang-an Bridge massacre.

Sadyah is an assistant professor in De La Salle University and she graduated from the University of the Philippines – Visayas with a degree in literature. The novel chronicles her search for love and happiness through her relationships with Stephen Chua, Ishmael Onos, Priya Iyer.

== Characters ==
Sadyah Zapanta – Lopez is an assistant professor in De La Salle University from Antique who currently lives in Manila. She seeks closure with her family about what really happened that night during the Guinsang-an Bridge massacre.

Marcelo N. Lopez is Sadyah's grandfather. He was imprisoned because he was accused of being the mastermind of the Guinsang-an Bridge massacre.

Leandro Lopez is the father of Sadyah and the husband of Teresa. During his days as a commander in the NPA, he was called Kumander Pusa. Pusa is the Tagalog word for cat and he was given this name because of his ability to escape death in many dangerous situations.

Teresa Lopez is the mother of Sadyah and the wife of Leandro. During her days as a commander in the NPA, she was called Kumander Rafflesia. Rafflesia is a kind of parasitic flower mainly found in southeast Asia.

Stephen Chua is Sadyah's first lover in the novel. She meets him online but they eventually decide to meet in person. Their relationship was more sexual than emotional, both of them seemingly detached from each other.

Ishmael Onos is Sadyah's second lover in the novel. He is a Muslim and Sadyah meets him in a Muslim–Christian forum.

Priya Iyer is Sadyah's third lover in the novel. He is an Indian corporate professional living in the building adjacent from Sadyah's building.

Auntie Fely and Uncle Lydio are Sadyah's aunt and uncle. Auntie Fely is the sister of Sadyah's father Leandro and uncle Lydio is her husband. They raised Sadyah after her parents left her in their care.

Nene and Bong Bong are Sadyah's cousins. They are the children of her auntie Fely and Uncle Lydio. Sadyah grew up with Nene and Bong Bong.

== Reviews/Studies on Lumbay ng Dila ==
For this was the root of our tongue's sorrow, the lumbay ng dila: that whatever we taste, and say, is not––and cannot be––fully ours.

-Edgar Calabia Samar

Very neutral approach in storytelling. Asenjo is said to be one of the new voices in Philippine literature.

-K.D Absolutely

I really enjoyed reading this novel because it brought out the Filipino woman within me. This novel caused me to have different emotions in a matter of time. Thus, I really recommend everyone, especially the Filipinos, to read this book.

-Abigail Punongbayan

Lumbay ng Dila explores themes of positive thinking and love, portraying them as forces capable of overcoming adversity.

-Alissa Lim

Kailangang mabasa ang nobelang ito ng lahat ng tunay na nagmamahal sa sariling bayan, hindi lamang dahil maganda ang kuwento kundi dahil din sa makabuluhan at nakaaaliw na gamit ng wikang Filipino.

-Isagani R. Cruz

Ang nobelang ito’y hindi chick lit, hindi pa-erotic lang. Laman nito’y aspirasyon ng kababaihan, na aspirasyon din ng bayan.

-Jun Cruz Reyes

Isang misyon at adbokasi na ni Asenjo na buong pagmamahal at pagmamalaking isentro ng kanyang panitik ang kanyang kinamulatang wika sa Visaya [Kinaray-a], gayundin ang barayting wikang Kinaray-a-Filipino.

-Fanny A. Garcia

Although Lumbay ng Dila is Asenjo's first novel, her work has been noted for its structure and plot, characterization, setting, themes, point of view, and use of language.

-Gerardo Z. Torres

Mula sa politika ng kasaysayan at espasyo hanggang sa politika ng wika at katawan, ang nobela ni Asenjo ay marapat saludsurin sa nagtatalabang mga ideolohiya sa loob at sa labas ng nobela na nagbunsod ng pagkabuo nito

-John Clifford Sibayan

Iba't ibang emosyon ang aking naramdaman sa pagbabasa ng nobela, may mga panahon na naiinis ako at naaartehan. May mga panahon na nararamdaman ko ang pag-iibigan ng ating mga tauhan pati na rin ang init ng mga eksena. May mga panahon din na nagagalit ako sa nagiging takbo ng kwento at mga motibasyon sa kilos ng ating mga tauhan.

– Joseph Martin Jose

== Other forms of media ==
- Lumbay ng Dila Trailer – an unofficial trailer under the YouTube channel of Martin Angelo Ramirez
- An illustrated comic by John Christoper Lim and Christian Kyle Fernin Can be found here
