= Atomic coherence =

Type of state of an atom-electromagnetic field system

In physics, atomic coherence is the induced coherence between levels of a multi-level atomic system and an electromagnetic field.

The internal state of an atom is characterized by a superposition of excited states and their associated energy levels. In the presence of external electromagnetic fields, the atom's energy levels acquire perturbations to the excited states that describe the atom's internal state. When the acquired phase is the same over the range of internal states, the atom is coherent. Atomic coherence is characterized by the length of time over which the internal state of the atom can be reliably manipulated.

== Measuring coherence ==
Atomic coherence can be characterized by the coherence time. For example, the contrast in Ramsey fringes has been used to measure the relaxation time, $T_2$, in a trapped ion and in neutral atoms. Similarly, the coherence time can be characterized by measuring the population transfer over time of an atom undergoing Rabi oscillations.

== Examples ==
=== Atomic interferometry ===
An atom interferometer creates coherent atomic beams, where the coherence is with respect to the phase of the atom's de Broglie wave.

=== Rabi flopping ===
If an electron in a two level atomic system is excited by narrow line width coherent electro-magnetic radiation, like a laser, that is on resonance with the two level transition, the electron will Rabi flop. During Rabi flopping the electron oscillates between the ground and excited states and can be described by a continuous rotation around the Bloch sphere.

For a perfectly isolated system, a particle undergoing Rabi oscillation between two levels will remain in phase. In practice, interactions between the system and the environment introduce a phase offset in the Rabi oscillation between the two levels, causing "decoherence".

Rabi flopping between the $^2S_{1/2}$ and $^2D_{5/2}$ energy states in $^{88}\text{Sr}^+$. This example shows high fidelity Rabi flopping on the clock transition with little decoherence.

If instead of a single two-level system, an ensemble of identical two level systems (such as a chain of identical atoms in an ion trap) is prepared and continuously addressed with a laser, all the atoms will coherently Rabi flop. All two level systems will initially have a defined relative phase and the system will be coherent.

As atoms undergo random spontaneous emission their Rabi oscillations will accumulate a random relative phase with respect to each other and become decoherent. In actual experiments ambient magnetic field noise and thermal heating from collisions between atoms cause decoherence faster than random spontaneous emission and are the dominant uncertainties when running atomic clocks or trapped ion quantum computers. Atomic coherence can also apply to multi-level systems which require more than a single laser.

Atomic coherence is essential in research on several effects, such as electromagnetically induced transparency (EIT), lasing without inversion (LWI), stimulated raman adiabatic passage (STIRAP) and nonlinear optical interaction with enhanced efficiency.

Atomic systems demonstrating continuous superradiance exhibit long coherence time, a property shared with lasers.

== See also ==
- Atom interferometer – Interferometer which uses the wave-like nature of atoms
- Atom optics – Techniques to exploit wave properties of atoms
- Matter wave – Quantum mechanical waves describing matter
- Rabi cycle – Quantum mechanical phenomenon
