= H. Jeff Kimble =

American physicist (1949–2024)

- Born: April 23, 1949; Floydada, Texas, U.S.
- Died: September 2, 2024 (aged 75); Austin, Texas, U.S.
- Education: Abilene Christian University (BA); University of Rochester (MS, PhD)
- Known for: Quantum information science
- Scientific career
- Fields: Physics
- Workplaces: University of Texas at Austin; California Institute of Technology
- Doctoral advisor: Leonard Mandel
- Doctoral students: Mark G. Raizen; Hideo Mabuchi
- Other notable students: Gerhard Rempe; Jun Ye; Ana Asenjo Garcia; Jonathan David Hood
- Website: www.its.caltech.edu/~qoptics/

Harry Jeffrey Kimble (April 23, 1949 – September 2, 2024) was an American physicist who was the William L. Valentine Professor and professor of physics at Caltech. His research was in quantum optics and is noted for groundbreaking experiments in physics including one of the first demonstrations of teleportation of a quantum state (first demonstration is disputed with Anton Zeilinger), quantum logic gate, and the development of the first single atom laser. According to Elizabeth Rogan, OSA CEO, "Jeff has led a revolution in modern physics through his pioneering research in the coherent control of the interactions of light and matter." Kimble's main research focus was in quantum information science and the quantum dynamics of open systems.

== Life and career ==
Kimble graduated summa cum laude from Abilene Christian University in 1971 and earned his master's and doctoral degrees from University of Rochester, culminating in 1979. He was advised by Leonard Mandel. As a graduate student under Mandel, Kimble observed the first photon anti-bunching. He spent two years as a scientist for the General Motors Research Laboratory until 1979 when he joined the faculty at the University of Texas at Austin. He moved to the California Institute of Technology in 1989.

Kimble was a Fellow of the American Association for the Advancement of Science, the American Physical Society, and the Optical Society of America. He was elected as a member of the National Academy of Sciences in 2002.

Kimble died in Austin, Texas on September 2, 2024, at the age of 75.

== Honors and awards ==
- Einstein Prize for Laser Science of the Society for Optical and Quantum Electronics (awarded at Lasers '89)
- The Albert A. Michelson Medal of the Franklin Institute (1990)
- The Max Born Award of the Optical Society of America (1996)
- The International Award on Quantum Communication (1998)
- The Julius Edgar Lilienfeld Prize of the American Physical Society (2004)
- The inaugural Berthold Leibinger Zukunftspreis of the German Berthold Leibinger Stiftung (2006)
- Doctor Scientiarum Honoris Causa, University of Copenhagen (2007)
- The Herbert Walther Award (2013)
- Leonard Mandel Quantum Optics Award (2024)
