= Leonard Mandel =

German physicist

- Born: 9 May 1927; Berlin, Germany
- Died: 9 February 2001 (aged 73); Pittsford, United States
- Known for: Hong-Ou-Mandel effect Mandel Q parameter Optical Coherence and Quantum Optics
- Awards: Fellow of the Optical Society; Max Born Award (1982); Thomas Young Medal and Prize (1989); Frederic Ives Medal (1993)
- Scientific career
- Fields: Optics; Quantum optics
- Workplaces: Imperial College London; University of Rochester

Leonard Mandel (May 9, 1927 – February 9, 2001) was an American physicist who contributed to the development of theoretical and experimental modern optics and is widely considered one of the founding fathers of the field of quantum optics. With Emil Wolf he published the highly regarded book Optical Coherence and Quantum Optics.

== Life ==
Mandel was born in Berlin, Germany, where his father, Robert (Naftali) Mandel, had emigrated from Eastern Europe.

He received a BSc degree in mathematics and physics in 1947 and a PhD degree in nuclear physics in 1951 from Birkbeck College, University of London, in the United Kingdom. He became a technical officer at Imperial Chemical Industries Ltd in Welwyn, UK, in 1951. In 1955, he became a lecturer and, later, senior lecturer at Imperial College London, University of London. He remained at Imperial until 1964, when he joined the University of Rochester as a professor of physics.

Mandel was the Lee DuBridge Professor Emeritus of Physics and Optics at the University of Rochester when he died at the age of 73 at his home in Pittsford, New York.

Mandel published over 260 scientific papers dealing with problems of optical coherence, lasers, quantum interactions and non-classical states of light. Together with Prof. Emil Wolf, Mandel organized a series of international conferences, known as the Rochester Conferences on Coherence and Quantum Optics, which were extremely influential in the history of the field of quantum optics. Mandel was a referee for approximately 24 scientific journals and 6 research agencies. He was on the Board of Directors of the Optical Society of America from 1985-1988, and was Associate Editor of the Journal of the Optical Society 1970-1976 and 1982-1983. Mandel was also a member of the Editorial Board for both Physical Review and Quantum Optics. In 2023 the Optica Foundation (formerly the Optical Society of America) established the Leonard Mandel Quantum Optics Award in recognition of Mandel's seminal contributions to the field. The award will be given annually and will recognize distinguished contributions to the foundations of statistical and quantum optics and applications to advanced technologies. In addition to his ground-breaking research, Mandel was known as an exceptional teacher and in 1992 he was awarded the Faculty Graduate Teaching Award by the University of Rochester.

== Influence ==
As written by Jeff Kimble and Emil Wolf in Physics Today:

Mandel is widely credited as being one of the founding fathers of the field of quantum optics. Although he made seminal contributions across most of quantum optics, the central theme of his research was the exploration of the nature of light through insightful theoretical analyses and a set of pioneering experiments that have become landmarks in the field. Not since the beginning of quantum mechanics has an individual so intimately investigated and so dramatically advanced our understanding of the quantum aspects of light.

== Awards ==
Mandel was a Fellow of the Optical Society of America and of the American Physical Society and received the following awards:

- 1982 – Max Born Award - Mandel was the first recipient of the Max Born prize awarded by the Optical Society of America.
- 1987 – Marconi Medal, awarded by the Italian National Research Council.
- 1989 – Thomas Young Medal and Prize, for distinguished research in the field of optics
- 1993 – Frederic Ives Medal, Recognizing overall distinction in optics
- 1994 – Elected Member of the New York Academy of Sciences
- 1996 – Elected Member of the American Academy of Arts and Sciences
- 2001 – Elected Member of the National Academy of Sciences (posthumously)

== See also ==
- Hong–Ou–Mandel effect
- Mandel Q parameter
