= Ana Asenjo Garcia =

Spanish physicist

Ana Asenjo-García
- Education: Universidad Complutense de Madrid
- Scientific career
- Workplaces: Columbia University; ICFO; California Institute of Technology
- Thesis: Interacción de plasmones, luz y haces de electrones en la nanoescala (2014)

Ana Asenjo-Garcia is a Spanish physicist who is a professor of physics at Columbia University. She investigates quantum optics and many body physics. She is part of a United States Department of Energy program focused on the creation of programmable quantum materials.

== Early life and education ==
Asenjo-Garcia is from a small city in Spain. She became interested in physics as a teenager, with a particular focus on astrophysics. She was an undergraduate student at the Complutense University of Madrid, after which she stayed for a master's degree in theoretical physics. She was awarded a Ministry of Education scholarship to pursue her doctoral research in plasmonic nanostructures, after which she was a postdoctoral researcher at ICFO. Asenjo-Garcia was named a Marie Skłodowska-Curie Actions fellowship and moved to the California Institute of Technology.

== Research and career ==
In 2019, Asenjo-Garcia joined Columbia University as a Lenfest Faculty Fellow. She is part of the Columbia Centre for Programmable Quantum Materials. Robert H. Dicke explained that after atoms become excited (i.e. after they are irradiated) the intensity of the light pulse single atoms emit as they relax back down to ground state will start to decrease. At first, the intensity of light emitted by a group of atoms will increase (so-called superradiance), because atoms emit most of their light in a short burst. Asenjo-Garcia showed that superradiance can arise due to the collective behaviour of arrays of atoms. Her research showed that the problem could be simplified to two photons: if the first does not speed up the emission of the second, or the atoms are too far apart from one another, superradiance will not occur.

Asenjo-Garcia developed 2D materials for nonlinear optics. These materials expand upon the concept of twistronics to incorporate optical activity showing that the nonlinear optical signals scale with the number of twisted interfaces.

Asenjo-Garcia was awarded a David and Lucile Packard Foundation Fellowship in 2021.

== Selected publications ==
- A. Asenjo-Garcia; M. Moreno-Cardoner; A. Albrecht; H. J. Kimble; D. E. Chang (2017). "Exponential Improvement in Photon Storage Fidelities Using Subradiance and "Selective Radiance" in Atomic Arrays". Physical Review X. 7 (3). arXiv:1703.03382. doi:10.1103/physrevx.7.031024. Wikidata Q59714483.
- Xibo Shen; Ana Asenjo-Garcia; Qing Liu; Qiao Jiang; F. Javier García de Abajo; Na Liu; Baoquan Ding (2013). "Three-dimensional plasmonic chiral tetramers assembled by DNA origami". Nano Letters. 13 (5): 2128–2133. doi:10.1021/nl400538y. PMID 23600476. Wikidata Q86622497.
- Jonathan D Hood; Akihisa Goban; Ana Asenjo-Garcia; Mingwu Lu; Su-Peng Yu; Darrick E Chang; H J Kimble (2016). "Atom-atom interactions around the band edge of a photonic crystal waveguide". Proceedings of the National Academy of Sciences of the United States of America. 113 (38): 10507–10512. arXiv:1603.02771. Bibcode:2016PNAS..11310507H. doi:10.1073/pnas.1603788113. PMC 5035845. PMID 27582467. Wikidata Q37281387.
