= Genevieve L. Asenjo =

Filipino poet and fictionist

Genevieve L. Asenjo is a Filipino poet, novelist, translator and literary scholar in Kinaray-a, Hiligaynon and Filipino. Her first novel, Lumbay ng Dila, (C&E/DLSU, 2010) received a citation for the Juan C. Laya Prize for Excellence in Fiction in a Philippine Language in the National Book Award.

In 2012, Asenjo participated in the International Writing Program (IWP) Fall Residency of the University of Iowa. In 2009, she spent six months in Seoul as Overseas Writing Fellow sponsored by the Ministry of Culture and Tourism of South Korea.

Asenjo is an associate Professor at De La Salle University in Manila. In 2010, she founded Balay Sugidanun (The House of Storytelling).

== Work ==
She is finishing her second novel, the first in contemporary Kinaray-a, titled Kamatayun sa Isla Boracay. Her earlier books include Komposo ni Dandansoy (UST Press, 2007), a collection of her Don Carlos Palanca Memorial Awards for Literature winning stories in Hiligaynon with translation in Filipino, Pula ang Kulay ng Text Message (University of San Agustin Press, 2006), a collection of poetry in Kinaray-a with translation in Filipino, and taga-uma@manila (National Commission for Culture and the Arts, 2005), a collection of short stories in Kinaray-a. Her first book of children's stories, Mabaskog nga Hiligaynon 1, (C&E, 2013) is accompanied by a teacher's guide for the Mother Tongue curriculum in the K-12 program of the Philippine government. Her essay, After America (2012), is part of the On Going Home series where authors who have spent nearly three months in the U.S. writing, researching, travelling, and interacting with Americans share their experiences and insight on what the process of returning home was like.

== Reviews/Studies on Genevieve Asenjo's work ==
Water and/or bodies of water is the predominant motif in the poems of Genevieve Asenjo created in the years 1995 to 2005 and was published in her book Pula ang Kulay ng Text Message. The recurrence of water and bodies of water in her works signifies the presence and importance of the said resource to Antique and to the Antiqueños. As a vital part of the community, water also represents artistic expression and human experience which in return reflects West Visayan culture, tradition and identity. - Bea Altar, et al. (2019)

== Interviews ==
- On the Map 2012: Genevieve L. ASENJO (2012)
- Behind the Pages: A Conversation with Genevieve Asenjo (2018)
