= Nina Frick Asenjo =

Chilean pianist and composer

Nina Frick Asenjo (November 19, 1884 – 1963) was a Chilean pianist and composer.
