= Super-Poissonian distribution =

In mathematics, a super-Poissonian distribution is a probability distribution that has a larger variance than a Poisson distribution with the same mean. Conversely, a sub-Poissonian distribution has a smaller variance.

An example of a super-Poissonian distribution is the negative binomial distribution.

The Poisson distribution is a result of a process where the time (or an equivalent measure) between events has an exponential distribution, representing a memoryless process.

== Mathematical definition ==
In probability theory it is common to say a distribution, D, is a sub-distribution of another distribution E if D 's moment-generating function, is bounded by E 's up to a constant. In other words

$$E_{X\sim D}[\exp(t X)] \le E_{X\sim E}[\exp(C t X)].$$

for some C > 0. This implies that if $X_1$ and $X_2$ are both from a sub-E distribution, then so is $X_1+X_2$.

A distribution is strictly sub- if C ≤ 1. From this definition a distribution, D, is sub-Poissonian if

$$E_{X\sim D}[\exp(t X)]
\le E_{X\sim \text{Poisson}(\lambda)}[\exp(t X)]
= \exp(\lambda(e^t-1)),$$

for all t > 0.

An example of a sub-Poissonian distribution is the Bernoulli distribution, since

$$E[\exp(t X)] = (1-p)+p e^t \le \exp(p(e^t-1)).$$

Because sub-Poissonianism is preserved by sums, we get that the binomial distribution is also sub-Poissonian.
