= Quantum optics =

Sub-field of quantum physics and optics

Quantum optics is a branch of atomic, molecular, and optical physics and quantum chemistry that studies the behavior of photons (individual quanta of light). It includes the study of the particle-like properties of photons and their interaction with, for instance, atoms and molecules. Photons have been used to test many of the counter-intuitive predictions of quantum mechanics, such as entanglement and teleportation, and are a useful resource for quantum information processing.

== History ==
Light propagating in a restricted volume of space has its energy and momentum quantized into an integer number of particles known as photons. Quantum optics investigates the nature and effects of light as a collection of discrete quanta known as photons. The first major development leading to this understanding was Max Planck's 1900 modeling of the blackbody radiation spectrum, which hypothesized that energy is emitted in discrete units. The photoelectric effect was further evidence of this quantization as explained by Albert Einstein in a 1905 paper, a discovery for which he was to be awarded the Nobel Prize in 1921. Niels Bohr showed that the hypothesis of optical radiation being quantized corresponded to his theory of the quantized energy levels of atoms, and the spectrum of discharge emission from hydrogen in particular. The understanding of the interaction between light and matter following these developments was crucial for the development of quantum mechanics as a whole. However, the subfields of quantum mechanics dealing with matter-light interaction were principally regarded as research into matter rather than into light; hence one rather spoke of atomic physics and quantum electronics in 1960. Laser science—i.e., research into principles, design and application of these devices—became an important field, and the quantum mechanics underlying the laser's principles was studied now with more emphasis on the properties of light, and the name quantum optics became customary.

Following Dirac's work in quantum field theory, John R. Klauder, George Sudarshan, Roy J. Glauber, and Leonard Mandel applied quantum theory to the electromagnetic field in the 1950s and 1960s to gain a more detailed understanding of photodetection and the statistics of light (see degree of coherence). This led to the introduction of the coherent state as a concept that addressed variations between laser light, thermal light, exotic squeezed states, etc. as it became understood that light cannot be fully described just referring to the electromagnetic fields describing the waves in the classical picture. In 1977, Kimble et al. demonstrated a single atom emitting one photon at a time, further compelling evidence that light consists of photons. Previously unknown quantum states of light with characteristics unlike classical states, such as squeezed light were subsequently discovered.

Development of short and ultrashort laser pulses—created by Q switching and modelocking techniques—opened the way to the study of what became known as ultrafast processes. Applications for solid state research (e.g. Raman spectroscopy) were found, and mechanical forces of light on matter were studied. The latter led to levitating and positioning clouds of atoms or even small biological samples in an optical trap or optical tweezers by laser beam. This, along with Doppler cooling and Sisyphus cooling, was the crucial technology needed to achieve the celebrated Bose–Einstein condensation.

Other remarkable results are the demonstration of quantum entanglement, quantum teleportation, and quantum logic gates. The latter are of much interest in quantum information theory, a subject that partly emerged from quantum optics, partly from theoretical computer science.

Today's fields of interest among quantum optics researchers include parametric down-conversion, parametric oscillation, even shorter (attosecond) light pulses, use of quantum optics for quantum information, manipulation of single atoms, Bose–Einstein condensates, their application, and how to manipulate them (a sub-field often called atom optics), coherent perfect absorbers, and many more. Topics classified under the term of quantum optics, especially as applied to engineering and technological innovation, often go under the modern term photonics.

Several Nobel Prizes have been awarded for work in quantum optics. These were awarded as follows:

- in 1997, Steven Chu, Claude Cohen-Tannoudji and William Daniel Phillips "for laser cooling".
- in 2001, Wolfgang Ketterle, Eric Allin Cornell and Carl Wieman "for experimental verification of the Bose-Einstein condensation".
- in 2005, Theodor W. Hänsch, Roy J. Glauber and John L. Hall "for development of quantum theory of light and development of optical frequency measuring technique".
- in 2012, Serge Haroche and David J. Wineland "for ground-breaking experimental methods that enable measuring and manipulation of individual quantum systems".
- in 2022, Alain Aspect, John Clauser and Anton Zeilinger "for experiments with entangled photons, establishing the violation of Bell inequalities and pioneering quantum information science".

== Concepts ==
According to quantum theory, light may be considered not only to be an electro-magnetic wave but also a "stream" of particles called photons, which travel with c, the speed of light in vacuum. These particles should not be considered to be classical billiard balls, but quantum mechanical particles described by a wavefunction spread over a finite region.

Each particle carries one quantum of energy, equal to hf, where h is the Planck constant and f is the frequency of the light. That energy possessed by a single photon corresponds exactly to the transition between discrete energy levels in an atom (or other system) that emitted the photon; material absorption of a photon is the reverse process. Einstein's explanation of spontaneous emission also predicted the existence of stimulated emission, the principle upon which the laser rests. However, the actual invention of the maser (and laser) many years later was dependent on a method to produce a population inversion.

The use of statistical mechanics is fundamental to the concepts of quantum optics: light is described in terms of field operators for creation and annihilation of photons—i.e. in the language of quantum electrodynamics.

A frequently encountered state of the light field is the coherent state, as introduced by E.C. George Sudarshan in 1960. This state, which can be used to approximately describe the output of a single-frequency laser well above the laser threshold, exhibits Poissonian photon number statistics. Via certain nonlinear interactions, a coherent state can be transformed into a squeezed coherent state, by applying a squeezing operator that can exhibit super- or sub-Poissonian photon statistics. Such light is called squeezed light. Other important quantum aspects are related to correlations of photon statistics between different beams. For example, spontaneous parametric down-conversion can generate so-called 'twin beams', where (ideally) each photon of one beam is associated with a photon in the other beam.

Atoms are considered as quantum mechanical oscillators with a discrete energy spectrum, with the transitions between the energy eigenstates being driven by the absorption or emission of light according to Einstein's theory.

For solid state matter, one uses the energy band models of solid state physics. This is important for understanding how light is detected by solid-state devices, commonly used in experiments.

== Quantum electronics ==
Quantum electronics is a term that was used mainly between the 1950s and 1970s to denote the area of physics dealing with the effects of quantum mechanics on the behavior of electrons in matter, together with their interactions with photons. Today, it is rarely considered a sub-field in its own right, and it has been absorbed by other fields. Solid state physics regularly takes quantum mechanics into account, and is usually concerned with electrons. Specific applications of quantum mechanics in electronics is researched within semiconductor physics. The term also encompassed the basic processes of laser operation, which is today studied as a topic in quantum optics. Usage of the term overlapped early work on the quantum Hall effect and quantum cellular automata.

== Applications ==
1. Quantum Cryptography (QKD) – Secure communication using single photons and entanglement (e.g., BB84 protocol)
2. Photonic Quantum Computing – Using photons as qubits to store and process quantum information.
3. Trapped Ion Quantum Computing – Uses lasers and magnetic fields to trap ions and process quantum information.
4. Atomic Clocks – World’s most precise clocks using optical transitions in atoms.
5. Interferometry – Precision measurements of length, time, and frequency.

== See also ==
- Atomic, molecular, and optical physics
- Attophysics
- Nonclassical light
- Optomechanics
- Quantum control
- Optical phase space
- Optical physics
- Optics
- Quantization of the electromagnetic field
- Two-state quantum system
- Spinplasmonics
- Valleytronics
