= Squeeze operator =

Operator in quantum physics

In quantum physics, the squeeze operator for a single mode of the electromagnetic field is

$$\hat{S}(z) = \exp \left ( {1 \over 2} (z^* \hat{a}^2 - z \hat{a}^{\dagger 2}) \right ) , \qquad z = r \, e^{i\theta}$$

where the operators inside the exponential are the ladder operators. It is a unitary operator and therefore obeys $S(z)\,S^\dagger (z) = S^\dagger (z)\,S(z) = \hat 1$, where $\hat 1$ is the identity operator.

Its action on the annihilation and creation operators produces

$$\hat{S}^{\dagger}(z) \, \hat{a} \, \hat{S}(z) = \hat{a}\cosh r - e^{i\theta} \hat{a}^{\dagger} \sinh r  \qquad\text{and}\qquad \hat{S}^{\dagger}(z) \, \hat{a}^{\dagger} \, \hat{S}(z) = \hat{a}^{\dagger}\cosh r - e^{-i\theta} \hat{a} \sinh r$$

The squeeze operator is ubiquitous in quantum optics and can operate on any state. For example, when acting upon the vacuum, the squeezing operator produces the squeezed vacuum state.

The squeezing operator can also act on coherent states and produce squeezed coherent states. The squeezing operator does not commute with the displacement operator:

$$\hat{S}(z) \hat{D}(\alpha) \neq \hat{D}(\alpha) \hat{S}(z),$$

nor does it commute with the ladder operators, so one must pay close attention to how the operators are used. There is, however, a simple braiding relation, $\hat{D}(\alpha)\hat{S}(z) =\hat{S}(z)\hat{S}^{\dagger}(z)\hat{D}(\alpha)\hat{S}(z)= \hat{S}(z)\hat{D}(\gamma), \qquad\text{where}\qquad \gamma=\alpha\cosh r + \alpha^* e^{i\theta} \sinh r$

Application of both operators above on the vacuum produces a displaced squeezed state:

$$\hat{D}(\alpha)\hat{S}(r)|0\rangle=|r, \alpha\rangle$$.

Or a squeezed coherent state:

$$\hat{S}(r)\hat{D}(\alpha)|0\rangle=|\alpha,r\rangle$$.

== Derivation of action on creation operator ==
As mentioned above, the action of the squeeze operator $S(z)$ on the annihilation operator $a$ can be written as
$$S^\dagger(z) a S(z)=\cosh(|z|)a-\frac{z}{|z|}\sinh(|z|)a^\dagger.$$
To derive this equality, let us define the (skew-Hermitian) operator $A\equiv (z a^{\dagger 2}-z^* a^2)/2$, so that $S^\dagger =e^A$.

The left hand side of the equality is thus $e^A a e^{-A}$. We can now make use of the general equality
$$e^A B e^{-A}=\sum_{k=0}^\infty \frac{1}{k!}[\underbrace{A,[A,\dots,[A}_{k\,\text{times}},B]\dots]],$$
which holds true for any pair of operators $A$ and $B$. To compute $e^A a e^{-A}$ thus reduces to the problem of computing the repeated commutators between $A$ and $a$. As can be readily verified, we have
$$[A,a]=\frac{1}{2}[z a^{\dagger 2}-z^* a^2,a]
= \frac{z}{2}[a^{\dagger 2},a] = -z a^\dagger,$$
$$[A,a^\dagger]=\frac{1}{2}[z a^{\dagger 2}-z^* a^2,a^\dagger]
= -\frac{z^*}{2}[a^{2},a^\dagger] = -z^* a.$$
Using these equalities, we obtain

$$[\underbrace{A,[A,\dots,[A}_{k},a]\dots]]=
\begin{cases}
|z|^k a, & \text{ for }k\text{ even},\\
-z|z|^{k-1} a^\dagger, & \text{ for }k\text{ odd}.
\end{cases}$$

so that finally we get

$e^A a e^{-A}= a \sum_{k=0}^\infty \frac{|z|^{2k}}{(2k)!} - a^\dagger \frac{z}{|z|}\sum_{k=0}^\infty \frac{|z|^{2k+1}}{(2k+1)!} = a\cosh|z|- a^\dagger e^{i\theta}\sinh|z|.$

The same result is also obtained by differentiating the transformed operator

$$a(t) = e^{tA} a \, e^{-tA}$$

with respect to the parameter $t$. A linear system of differential equations for $a(t)$ and $a^\dagger(t)$ emerges when working through the commutators $[A, a(t)]$ and $[A, a^\dagger(t)]$. Their formal solution provides the transformed operator $\hat{S}^\dagger a\,\hat{S} = a(t=1)$ as linear combination of $a$ and $a^\dagger$. The technique can be generalised to other operators or state transformations.

== See also ==
- Squeezed coherent state
