= John R. Klauder =

American physicist (1932–2024)

John Klauder
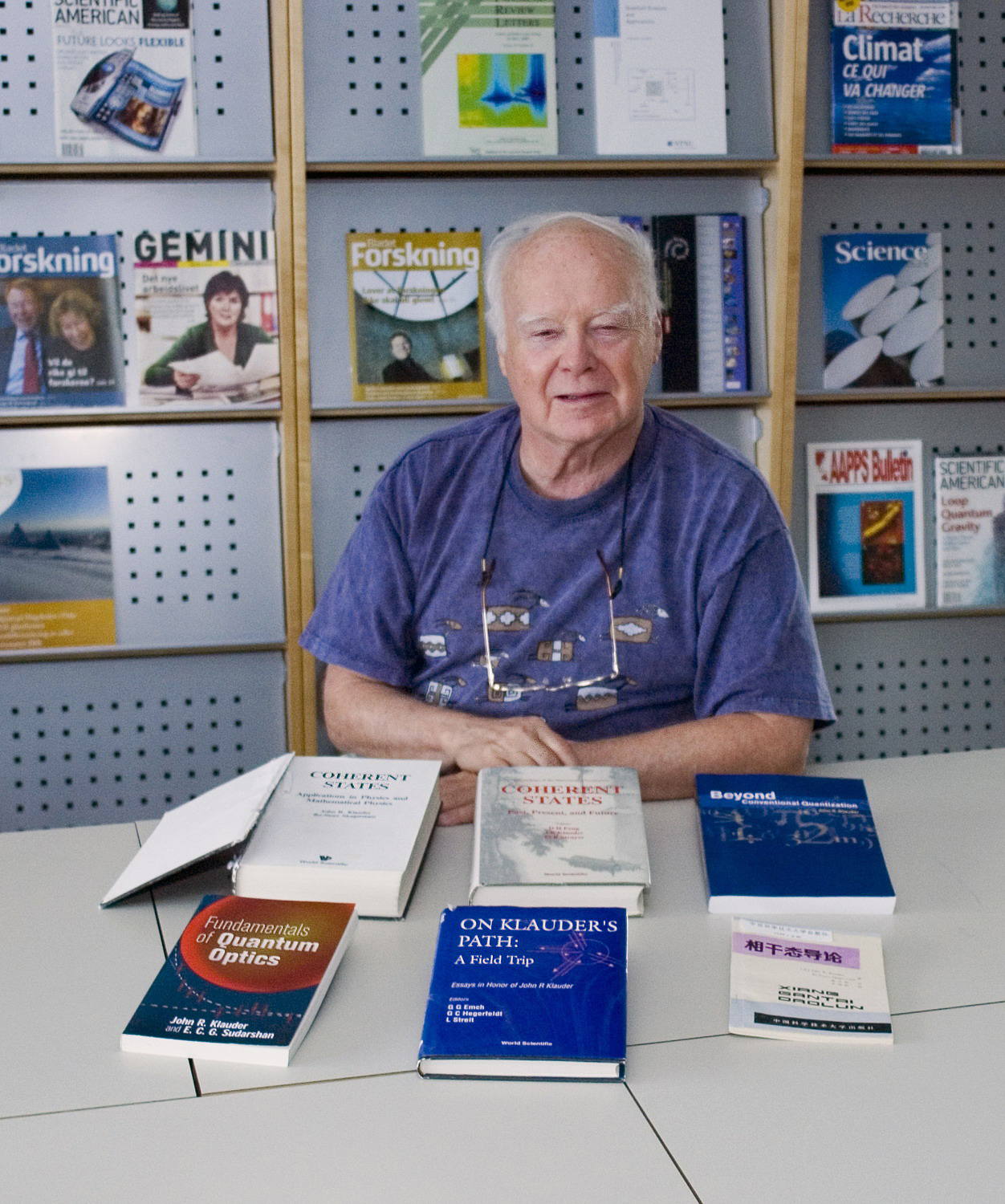
- Born: January 24, 1932 (age 94); Reading, Pennsylvania, US
- Died: October 24, 2024; Briarcliff Manor, New York, US
- Education: Princeton University; University of California, Berkeley
- Known for: Coherent states Gazeau–Klauder coherent states Chirp compression SU (1,1) Interferometry
- Awards: Onsager Medal (2006)
- Scientific career
- Fields: Physics and Mathematics
- Workplaces: University of Florida
- Doctoral advisor: John Archibald Wheeler

John Rider Klauder (January 24, 1932 – October 24, 2024) was an American professor of physics and mathematics, and the author of over 250 published articles on physics.

He graduated from the University of California, Berkeley in 1953 with a Bachelor of Science. He received his PhD in 1959 from Princeton University where he was a student of John Archibald Wheeler.

A former head of the Theoretical Physics and Solid State Spectroscopy of Bell Telephone Laboratories, he has been a visiting professor at Rutgers University, Syracuse University, and the University of Bern. In 1988, John Klauder was appointed professor of physics and mathematics at the University of Florida. He was awarded the title of distinguished professor in 2006 and became emeritus in 2010.

He was inducted as a Foreign Member of the Royal Norwegian Society of Sciences and Letters, and received the Onsager Medal in 2006 at NTNU (Norway).

He has also served on the Physics Advisory Panel of the National Science Foundation and been Editor of the Journal of Mathematical Physics, president of the International Association of Mathematical Physics, associate secretary-general of the International Union of Pure and Applied Physics.

== Bibliography ==
- Beyond Conventional Quantization - This book describes enhanced procedures, generally involving extended correspondence rules for the association of a classical and a quantum theory, which, when applied to such systems, yield nontrivial and acceptable results.
- Langevin Simulations in Minkowski Space - Numerical techniques for simulating quantum field theory.
- Coherent States - Applications in Physics and Mathematical Physics - A brief introduction to Coherent States followed by a collection of useful articles. Authored with B. S. Skagerstam.
- Fundamentals of Quantum Optics - Volume authored jointly with E. C. G. Sudarshan.
- On Klauder's Path: A Field Trip - "A volume in celebration of his 60th birthday."
