= Wehrl entropy =

Classic entropy of a quantum-mechanical density matrix

In quantum information theory, the Wehrl entropy, named after Alfred Wehrl, is a classical entropy of a quantum-mechanical density matrix. It is a type of quasi-entropy defined for the Husimi Q representation of the phase-space quasiprobability distribution.

== Definitions ==
The Husimi function is a "classical phase-space" function of position x and momentum p, and in one dimension is defined for any quantum-mechanical density matrix ρ by

$$Q_\rho(x,p)=\int \phi(x,p | y)^* \rho (y, y')\phi (x,p|y')dy dy',$$

where φ is a "(Glauber) coherent state", given by

$$\phi(x,p|y)=\pi^{-1/4}\exp(-|y-x|^2/2)+i\, px).$$

(It can be understood as the Weierstrass transform of the Wigner quasi-probability distribution.)

The Wehrl entropy is then defined as

$$S_W(\rho) = -\int Q_\rho(x,p) \log Q_\rho(x,p) \, dx \, dp ~.$$

The definition can be easily generalized to any finite dimension.

== Properties ==
Such a definition of the entropy relies on the fact that the Husimi Q representation remains non-negative definite, unlike other representations of quantum quasiprobability distributions in phase space. The Wehrl entropy has several important properties:

1. It is always positive, $S_W(\rho)\geq 0,$ like the full quantum von Neumann entropy, but unlike the classical differential entropy which can be negative at low temperature. In fact, the minimum value of the Wehrl entropy is 1, i.e. $S_W(\rho)\geq 1,$ as discussed below in the section "Werhl's conjecture".
2. The entropy for the tensor product of two systems is always greater than the entropy of one system. In other words, for a state $\rho$ on a Hilbert space $\mathcal{H}=\mathcal{H}_1\otimes\mathcal{H}_2$, we have $S_W(\rho_1)\leq S_W(\rho)$, where $\rho_1=\mathrm{Tr}_2\, \rho$. Note that the quantum von Neumann entropy, $S(\rho)$, does not have this property, as can be clearly seen for a pure maximally entangled state.
3. The Wehrl entropy is strictly lower bounded by a von Neumann entropy, $S_W(\rho) > S(\rho)$. There is no known upper or lower bound (other than zero) for the difference $S_W(\rho)-S(\rho)$.
4. The Wehrl entropy is not invariant under all unitary transformations, unlike the von Neumann entropy. In other words, $S_W(U^* \rho \,U)\neq S_W(\rho)$ for a general unitary U. It is, however, invariant under certain unitary transformations.

== Wehrl's conjecture ==
In his original paper Wehrl posted a conjecture that the smallest possible value of Wehrl entropy is 1, $S_W(\rho)\geq 1,$ and it occurs if and only if the density matrix $\rho$ is a pure state projector onto any coherent state, i.e. for all choices of $x_0, p_0$,

$$\rho_0(y, y')=\phi(x_0,p_0|y)^*\phi(x_0,p_0|y')$$.

Soon after the conjecture was posted, E. H. Lieb proved that the minimum of the Wehrl entropy is 1, and it occurs when the state is a projector onto any coherent state.

In 1991 E. Carlen proved the uniqueness of the minimizer, i.e. the minimum of the Wehrl entropy occurs only when the state is a projector onto any coherent state.

The analog of the Wehrl conjecture for systems with a classical phase space isomorphic to the sphere (rather than the plane) is the Lieb conjecture.

== Discussion ==
However, it is not the fully quantum von Neumann entropy in the Husimi representation in phase space, − ∫ Q ★ log_{_{★}}Q dx dp: all the requisite star-products ★ in that entropy have been dropped here. In the Husimi representation, the star products read

$$\star \equiv     \exp\left( \frac{\hbar}{2}
({\stackrel{\leftarrow}{\partial}}_x -i {\stackrel{\leftarrow}{\partial}}_p) ({\stackrel{\rightarrow}{\partial}}_x  + i{\stackrel{\rightarrow}{\partial}}_p )   \right)~,$$

and are isomorphic to the Moyal products of the Wigner–Weyl representation.

The Wehrl entropy, then, may be thought of as a type of heuristic semiclassical approximation to the full quantum von Neumann entropy, since it retains some ħ dependence (through Q) but not all of it.

Like all entropies, it reflects some measure of non-localization, as the Gauss transform involved in generating Q and the sacrifice of the star operators have effectively discarded information. In general, as indicated, for the same state, the Wehrl entropy exceeds the von Neumann entropy (which vanishes for pure states).

== Wehrl entropy for Bloch coherent states ==
Wehrl entropy can be defined for other kinds of coherent states. For example, it can be defined for Bloch coherent states, that is, for angular momentum representations of the group $SU(2)$ for quantum spin systems.

=== Bloch coherent states ===
Consider a space $\mathbb{C}^{2J+1}$ with $J=\frac{1}{2}, 1, \frac{3}{2}, \dots$ . We consider a single quantum spin of fixed angular momentum J, and shall denote by $\mathbf{S}=(S_x, S_y, S_z)$ the usual angular momentum operators that satisfy the following commutation relations: $[S_x, S_y]=i \,S_z$ and cyclic permutations.

Define $S_\pm=S_x\pm i\, S_y$, then $[S_z, S_\pm]=\pm S_\pm$ and $[S_+, S_-]=S_z$.

The eigenstates of $S_z$ are

$$S_z|s\rangle=s|s\rangle, s=-J,\dots, J.$$

For $s=J$ the state $|J\rangle\in \mathbb{C}^{2J+1}$ satisfies: $S_z|J\rangle=J|J\rangle,$ and $S_+|J\rangle=0, S_-|J\rangle=|J-1\rangle$.

Denote the unit sphere in three dimensions by

$$\Xi_2=\{\Omega=(\theta, \phi)\ | \ 0\leq \theta \leq \pi,\ 0\leq \phi\leq 2\pi\}$$,

and by $L^2(\Xi)$ the space of square integrable function on Ξ with the measure

$$d\Omega=\frac{2J+1}{4\pi}\sin\theta\, d\theta\, d\phi$$.

The Bloch coherent state is defined by

$$|\Omega\rangle\equiv \exp\left\{\frac{1}{2}\theta e^{i\phi}S_--\frac{1}{2}\theta e^{-i\phi}S_+\right\}|J\rangle$$.

Taking into account the above properties of the state $|J\rangle$, the Bloch coherent state can also be expressed as

$$|\Omega\rangle=(1+|z|^2)^{-J}e^{z S_-}|J\rangle=(1+|z|^2)^{-J}\sum_{M=-J}^J z^{J-M}\binom{2J}{J+M}^{1/2}|M\rangle,$$

where $~~z=e^{i\phi}\tan \frac{\theta}{2}$, and

$$|M\rangle=\binom{2J}{J+M}^{-1/2}\frac{1}{(J-M)!}\, S_-^{J-M}|J\rangle$$

is a normalised eigenstate of $S_z$ satisfying $S_z|M\rangle=M|M\rangle$.

The Bloch coherent state is an eigenstate of the rotated angular momentum operator $S_z$ with a maximum eigenvalue. In other words, for a rotation operator

$$R_{\theta,\phi}=\exp\left\{\frac{1}{2}\theta e^{i\phi} S_--\frac{1}{2}\theta e^{-i\phi} S_+ \right\}$$,

the Bloch coherent state $|\Omega\rangle$ satisfies

$$R_{\theta, \phi} S_z R^{-1}_{\theta, \phi} \ |\Omega\rangle=J\,|\Omega\rangle$$.

=== Wehrl entropy for Bloch coherent states ===
Given a density matrix ρ, define the semi-classical density distribution

$$\rho^{cl}(\Omega)=\langle \Omega| \rho |\Omega \rangle$$.

The Wehrl entropy of $\rho$ for Bloch coherent states is defined as a classical entropy of the density distribution $\rho^{cl}$,

$$S_W^B(\rho)=S^{cl}(\rho^{cl})=-\int \rho^{cl}(\Omega)\ \ln \rho^{cl}(\Omega)\ d\Omega$$,

where $S^{cl}$ is a classical differential entropy.

=== Wehrl's conjecture for Bloch coherent states ===
The analogue of the Wehrl's conjecture for Bloch coherent states was proposed in in 1978. It suggests the minimum value of the Werhl entropy for Bloch coherent states,

$$S_W^B(\rho)\geq \frac{2J}{2J+1}$$,

and states that the minimum is reached if and only if the state is a pure Bloch coherent state.

In 2012 E. H. Lieb and J. P. Solovej proved a substantial part of this conjecture, confirming the minimum value of the Wehrl entropy for Bloch coherent states, and the fact that it is reached for any pure Bloch coherent state. The uniqueness of the minimizers was proved in 2022 by R. L. Frank and A. Kulikov, F. Nicola, J. Ortega-Cerda' and P. Tilli.

== Generalized Wehrl's conjecture ==
In E. H. Lieb and J. P. Solovej proved Wehrl's conjecture for Bloch coherent states by generalizing it in the following manner.

=== Generalized Wehrl's conjecture ===
For any concave function $f: [0,1]\rightarrow \mathbb{R}$ (e.g. $f(x)=-x\log x$ as in the definition of the Wehrl entropy), and any density matrix ρ, we have

$$\int f(Q_\rho(x,p))dx\, dp \geq \int f(Q_{\rho_0}(x,p))dx\, dp$$,

where ρ_{0} is a pure coherent state defined in the section "Wehrl conjecture".

=== Generalized Wehrl's conjecture for Bloch coherent states ===
Generalized Wehrl's conjecture for Glauber coherent states was proved as a consequence of the similar statement for Bloch coherent states. For any concave function $f: [0,1]\rightarrow \mathbb{R}$, and any density matrix ρ we have

$$\int f(\langle \Omega|\rho|\Omega\rangle)d\Omega \geq \int f(|\langle \Omega|\Omega_0\rangle|^2)d\Omega$$,

where $\Omega_0\in\Xi_2$ is any point on a sphere.

The uniqueness of the minimizers was proved in the aforementioned papers and.

== See also ==
- Coherent state
- Entropy
- Information theory and measure theory
- Lieb conjecture
- Quantum information
- Quantum mechanics
- Spin
- Statistical mechanics
- Von Neumann entropy
