= Squeezed coherent state =

Type of quantum state

In physics, a squeezed coherent state is a quantum state that is usually described by two non-commuting observables having continuous spectra of eigenvalues. Examples are position $x$ and momentum $p$ of a particle, and the (dimension-less) electric field in the amplitude $X$ (phase 0) and in the mode $Y$ (phase 90°) of a light wave (the wave's quadratures). The product of the standard deviations of two such operators obeys the uncertainty principle:

$\Delta x \Delta p \geq \frac{\hbar}2\;$ and $\;\Delta X \Delta Y \geq \frac{1}4$ , respectively.

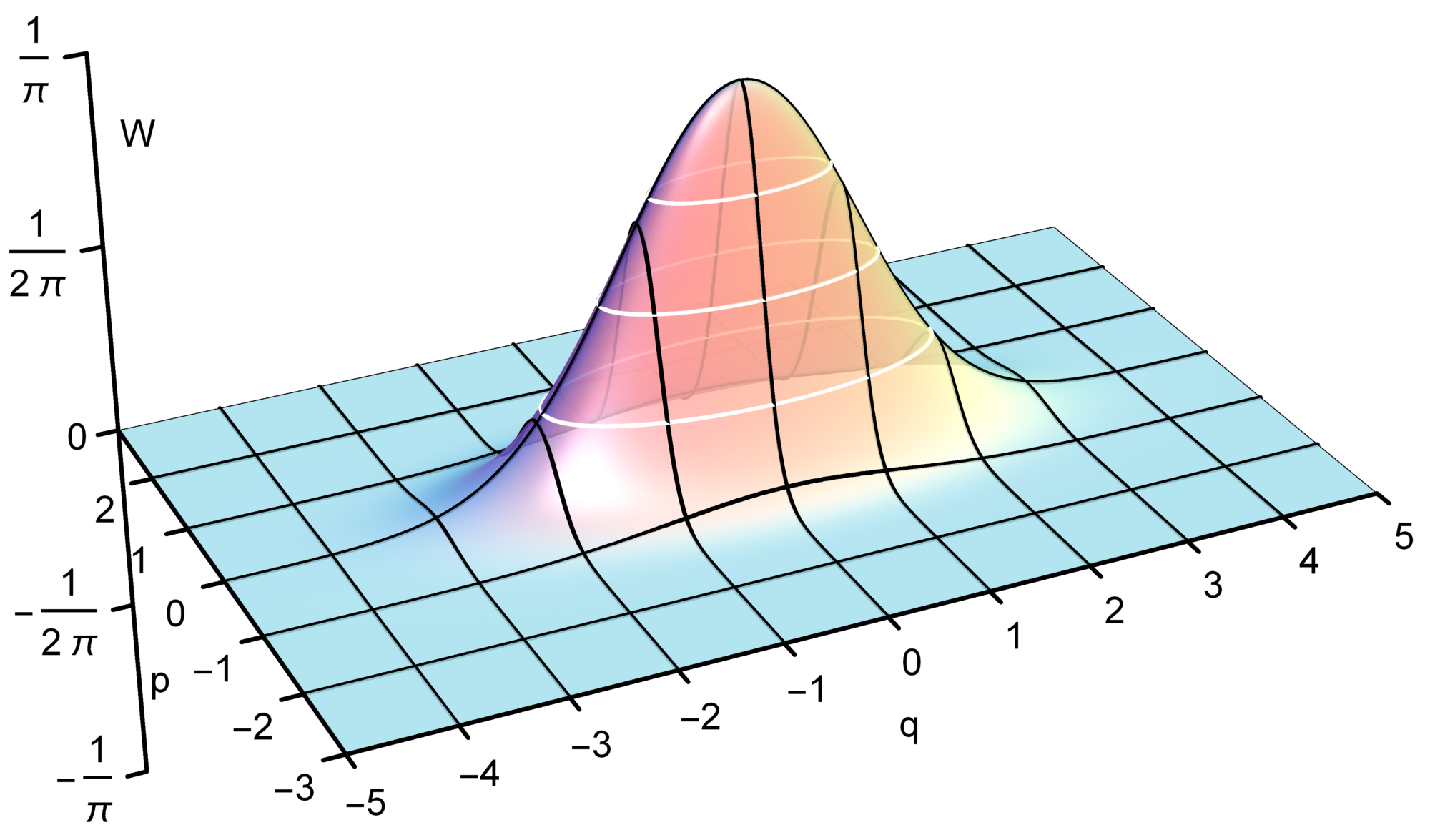
Wigner phase space distribution of a squeezed state of light with ζ=0.5.

Trivial examples, which are in fact not squeezed, are the ground state $|0\rangle$ of the quantum harmonic oscillator and the family of coherent states $|\alpha\rangle$. These states saturate the uncertainty above and have a symmetric distribution of the operator uncertainties with $\Delta x_g = \Delta p_g$ in "natural oscillator units" and $\Delta X_g = \Delta Y_g = 1/2$. (Note: In literature different normalizations for the quadrature amplitudes are used. Here we use the normalization for which the sum of the ground state variances of the quadrature amplitudes directly provide the zero point quantum number $\Delta^2 X_g + \Delta^2 Y_g = 1/2$)

The term squeezed state is actually used for states with a standard deviation below that of the ground state for one of the operators or for a linear combination of the two. The idea behind this is that the circle denoting the uncertainty of a coherent state in the quadrature phase space (see right) has been "squeezed" to an ellipse of the same area. Note that a squeezed state does not need to saturate the uncertainty principle.

Squeezed states of light were first produced in the mid 1980s. At that time, quantum noise squeezing by up to a factor of about 2 (3 dB) in variance was achieved, i.e. $\Delta^2 X \approx \Delta^2 X_g/2$. As of 2017, a squeeze factor of 31 (15 dB) has been directly observed.

== Mathematical definition ==
Animated position-wavefunction of a 2dB amplitude-squeezed coherent state of α=3.

The most general wave function that satisfies the identity above is the squeezed coherent state (we work in units with $\hbar=1$)

$$\psi(x) = C\,\exp\left(-\frac{(x-x_0)^2}{2 w_0^2} + i p_0 x\right)$$

where $C,x_0,w_0,p_0$ are constants (a normalization constant, the center of the wavepacket, its width, and the expectation value of its momentum). The new feature relative to a coherent state is the free value of the width $w_0$, which is the reason why the state is called "squeezed".

The squeezed state above is an eigenstate of a linear operator

$$\hat x + i\hat p w_0^2$$

and the corresponding eigenvalue equals $x_0+ip_0 w_0^2$. In this sense, it is a generalization of the ground state as well as the coherent state.

== Operator representation ==
The general form of a squeezed coherent state for a quantum harmonic oscillator is given by

$$|\alpha,\zeta\rangle = \hat{S}(\zeta)|\alpha\rangle = \hat{S}(\zeta) \hat{D}(\alpha)|0\rangle$$

where $|0\rangle$ is the vacuum state, $D(\alpha)$ is the displacement operator and $S(\zeta)$ is the squeeze operator, given by

$$\hat{D}(\alpha)=\exp (\alpha \hat a^\dagger - \alpha^* \hat a)\qquad \text{and}\qquad \hat{S}(\zeta)=\exp\bigg[\frac{1}{2} (\zeta^* \hat a^2-\zeta \hat a^{\dagger 2})\bigg]$$

where $\hat a$ and $\hat a^\dagger$ are annihilation and creation operators, respectively. For a quantum harmonic oscillator of angular frequency $\omega$, these operators are given by

$$\hat a^\dagger = \sqrt{\frac{m\omega}{2\hbar}}\left(x-\frac{i p}{m\omega}\right)\qquad \text{and} \qquad \hat a = \sqrt{\frac{m\omega}{2\hbar}}\left(x+\frac{i p}{m\omega}\right)$$

For a real $\zeta$, (note that $\zeta = r e^{2 i \theta}$, where r is squeezing parameter), the uncertainty in $x$ and $p$ are given by

$$(\Delta x)^2=\frac{\hbar}{2m\omega}\mathrm{e}^{-2\zeta}  \qquad\text{and}\qquad  (\Delta p)^2=\frac{m\hbar\omega}{2}\mathrm{e}^{2\zeta}$$

Therefore, a squeezed coherent state saturates the Heisenberg uncertainty principle $\Delta x\Delta p=\frac{\hbar}{2}$, with reduced uncertainty in one of its quadrature components and increased uncertainty in the other.

Some expectation values for squeezed coherent states are

$$\langle\alpha,\zeta | \hat a | \alpha,\zeta\rangle = \alpha \cosh(r) - \alpha^{*}e^{i\theta} \sinh(r)$$

$$\langle\alpha,\zeta | {\hat{a}}^2 | \alpha,\zeta\rangle = \alpha ^{2} \cosh^{2}(r) +{\alpha^{*}}^{2}e^{2i\theta} \sinh^{2}(r) - (1+2{|\alpha|}^{2})e^{i\theta} \cosh (r) \sinh (r)$$

$$\langle\alpha,\zeta | {\hat{a}}^{\dagger}\hat{a} | \alpha,\zeta\rangle = |\alpha|^2 \cosh^{2}(r) + (1+{|\alpha|}^{2})\sinh^2 (r) - ({\alpha}^2 e^{-i\theta} + {\alpha^{*}}^2 e^{i\theta})\cosh (r) \sinh (r)$$

The general form of a displaced squeezed state for a quantum harmonic oscillator is given by

$$|\zeta,\alpha\rangle = \hat{D}(\alpha)|\zeta\rangle = \hat{D}(\alpha) \hat{S}(\zeta)|0\rangle$$

Some expectation values for displaced squeezed state are

$$\langle\zeta,\alpha | \hat a | \zeta,\alpha\rangle = \alpha$$

$$\langle\zeta,\alpha | {\hat{a}}^2 | \zeta,\alpha\rangle = \alpha ^{2} - e^{i\theta} \cosh (r) \sinh (r)$$

$$\langle\zeta,\alpha | {\hat{a}}^{\dagger}\hat{a} | \zeta,\alpha\rangle = |\alpha|^2 + \sinh^2 (r)$$

Since $\hat{S}(\zeta)$ and $\hat{D}(\alpha)$ do not commute with each other,

$$\hat{S}(\zeta) \hat{D}(\alpha) \neq \hat{D}(\alpha) \hat{S}(\zeta)$$

$$| \alpha, \zeta \rangle \neq | \zeta, \alpha \rangle$$

where $\hat{D}(\alpha)\hat{S}(\zeta) =\hat{S}(\zeta)\hat{S}^{\dagger}(\zeta)\hat{D}(\alpha)\hat{S}(\zeta)= \hat{S}(\zeta)\hat{D}(\gamma)$, with $\gamma=\alpha\cosh r + \alpha^* e^{i\theta} \sinh r$

== Examples ==
Depending on the phase angle at which the state's width is reduced, one can distinguish amplitude-squeezed, phase-squeezed, and general quadrature-squeezed states. If the squeezing operator is applied directly to the vacuum, rather than to a coherent state, the result is called the squeezed vacuum. The figures below give a nice visual demonstration of the close connection between squeezed states and Heisenberg's uncertainty relation: Diminishing the quantum noise at a specific quadrature (phase) of the wave has as a direct consequence an enhancement of the noise of the complementary quadrature, that is, the field phase shifted by $\pi/2$.

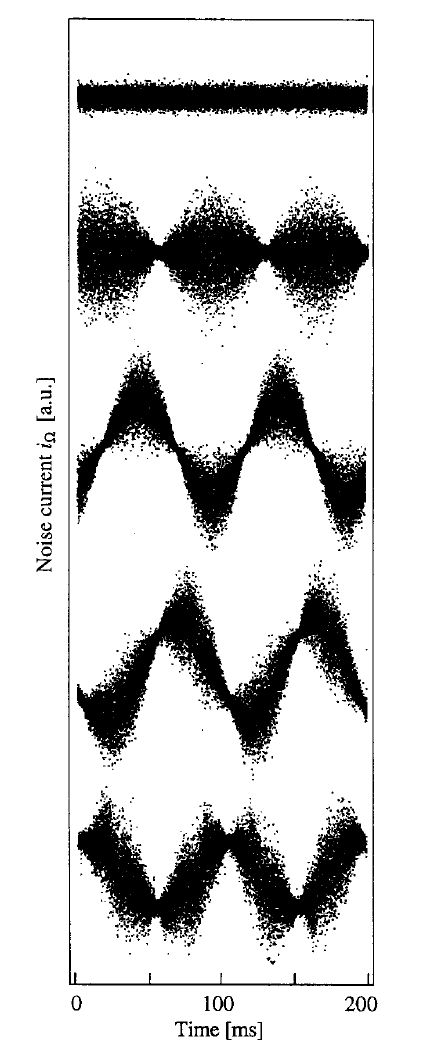
Measured quantum noise of the electric field (3π-interval shown for the first two states; 4π-interval for the last three states)

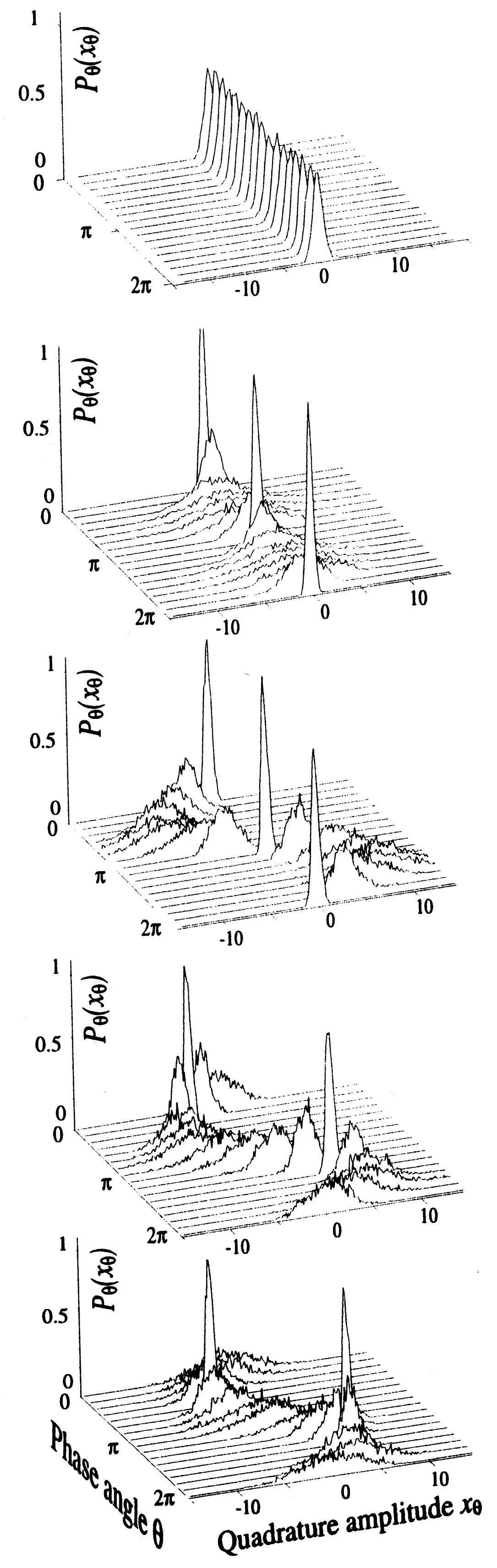
Oscillating wave packets of the five states.

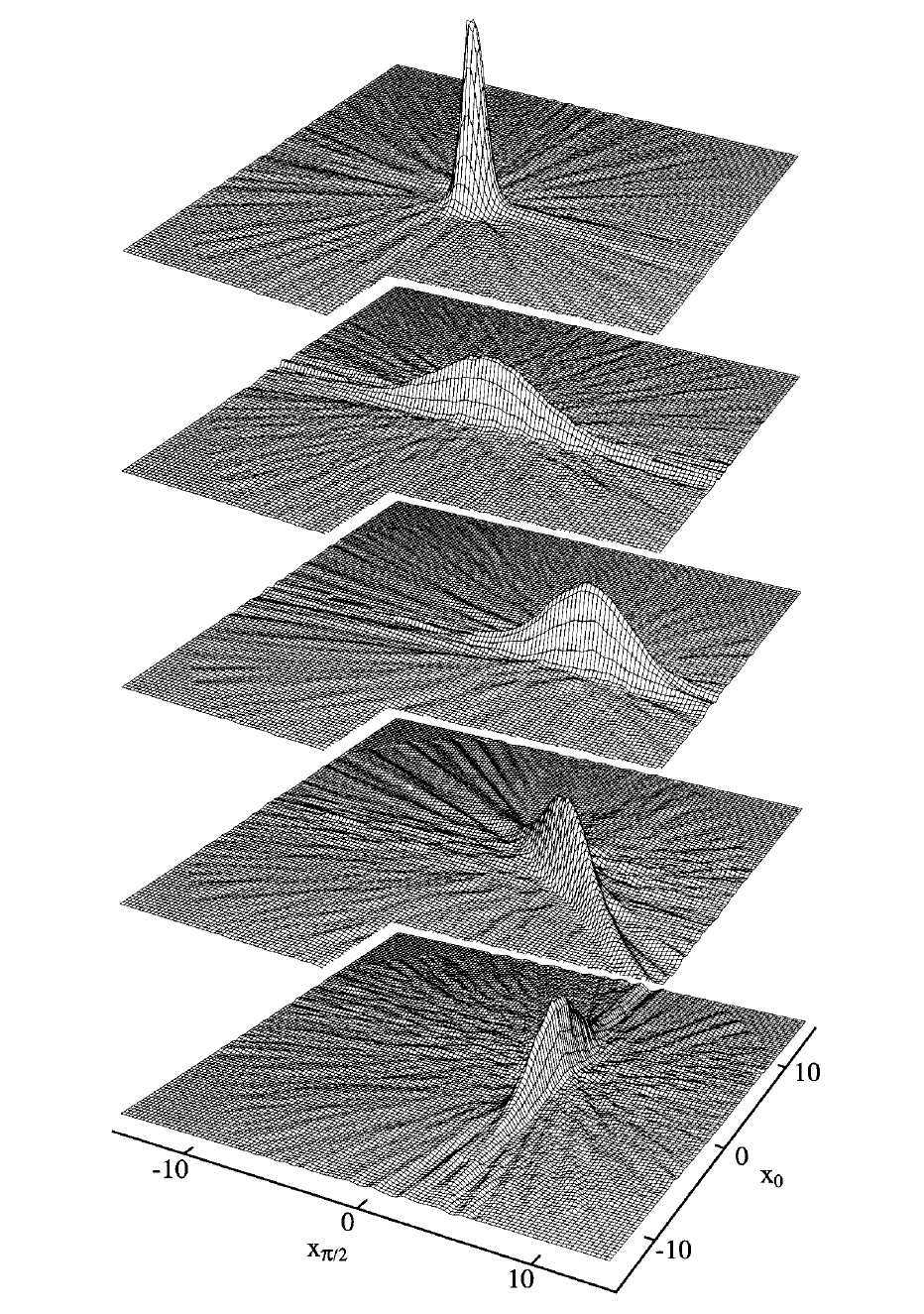
Wigner functions of the five states. The ripples are due to experimental inaccuracies.

Different squeezed states of laser light in a vacuum depend on the phase of the light field. Images from the top: (1) Vacuum state, (2) Squeezed vacuum state, (3) Phase-squeezed state (4) Arbitrary squeezed state (5) Amplitude-squeezed state

As can be seen in the illustrations, in contrast to a coherent state, the quantum noise for a squeezed state is no longer independent of the phase of the light wave. A characteristic broadening and narrowing of the noise during one oscillation period can be observed. The probability distribution of a squeezed state is defined as the norm squared of the wave function mentioned in the last paragraph. It corresponds to the square of the electric (and magnetic) field strength of a classical light wave. The moving wave packets display an oscillatory motion combined with the widening and narrowing of their distribution: the "breathing" of the wave packet. For an amplitude-squeezed state, the most narrow distribution of the wave packet is reached at the field maximum, resulting in an amplitude that is defined more precisely than the one of a coherent state. For a phase-squeezed state, the most narrow distribution is reached at field zero, resulting in an average phase value that is better defined than the one of a coherent state.

In phase space, quantum mechanical uncertainties can be depicted by the Wigner quasi-probability distribution. The intensity of the light wave, its coherent excitation, is given by the displacement of the Wigner distribution from the origin. A change in the phase of the squeezed quadrature results in a rotation of the distribution.

== Photon number distributions and phase distributions ==
The squeezing angle, that is the phase with minimum quantum noise, has a large influence on the photon number distribution of the light wave and its phase distribution as well.

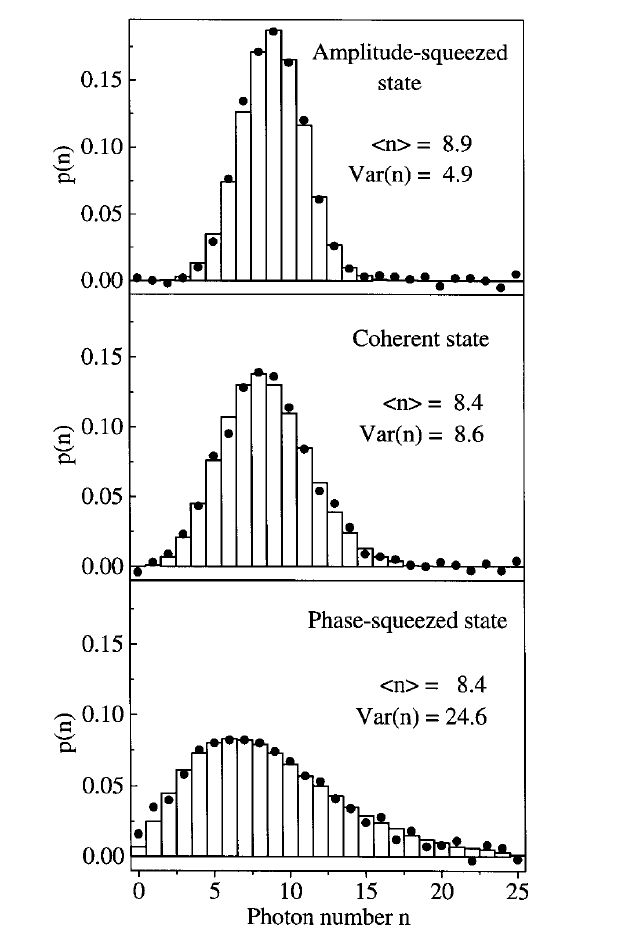
Experimental photon number distributions for an amplitude-squeezed state, a coherent state, and a phase squeezed state reconstructed from measurements of the quantum statistics. Bars refer to theory, dots to experimental values.

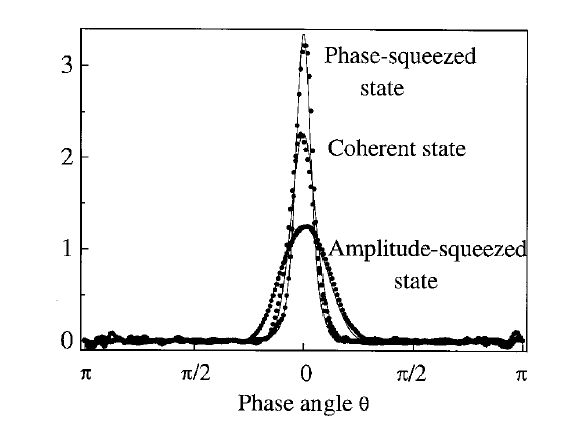
Pegg-Barnett phase distribution of the three states

For amplitude squeezed light the photon number distribution is usually narrower than the one of a coherent state of the same amplitude resulting in sub-Poissonian light, whereas its phase distribution is wider. The opposite is true for the phase-squeezed light, which displays a large intensity (photon number) noise but a narrow phase distribution. Nevertheless, the statistics of amplitude squeezed light was not observed directly with photon number resolving detector due to experimental difficulty.

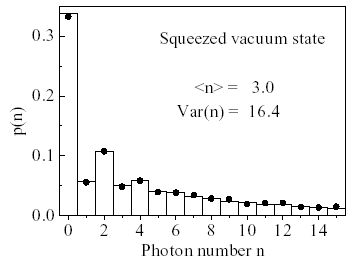
Reconstructed and theoretical photon number distributions for a squeezed-vacuum state. A pure squeezed vacuum state would have no contribution from odd-photon-number states. The non-zero contribution in the above figure is because the detected state is not a pure state – losses in the setup convert the pure squeezed vacuum into a mixed state. (source: link 1)

For the squeezed vacuum state the photon number distribution displays odd-even-oscillations. This can be explained by the mathematical form of the squeezing operator, that resembles the operator for two-photon generation and annihilation processes. Photons in a squeezed vacuum state are more likely to appear in pairs.

== Classification ==
=== Based on the number of modes ===
Squeezed states of light are broadly classified into single-mode squeezed states and two-mode squeezed states, depending on the number of modes of the electromagnetic field involved in the process. Recent studies have looked into multimode squeezed states showing quantum correlations among more than two modes as well.

==== Single-mode squeezed states ====
Single-mode squeezed states, as the name suggests, consists of a single mode of the electromagnetic field whose one quadrature has fluctuations below the shot noise level and the orthogonal quadrature has excess noise. Specifically, a single-mode squeezed vacuum (SMSV) state can be mathematically represented as,

$$|\text{SMSV}\rangle =  S(\zeta)|0\rangle$$

where the squeezing operator S is the same as introduced in the section on operator representations above. In the photon number basis, writing $\zeta = r e^{i\phi}$ this can be expanded as,

$$|\text{SMSV}\rangle = \frac{1}{\sqrt{\cosh r}} \sum_{n=0}^\infty (- e^{i\phi} \tanh r)^n \frac{\sqrt{(2n)!}}{2^n n!} |2n\rangle$$

which explicitly shows that the pure SMSV consists entirely of even-photon Fock state superpositions. Single mode squeezed states are typically generated by degenerate parametric oscillation in an optical parametric oscillator, or using four-wave mixing.

==== Two-mode squeezed states ====
Two-mode squeezing involves two modes of the electromagnetic field which exhibit quantum noise reduction below the shot noise level in a linear combination of the quadratures of the two fields. For example, the field produced by a nondegenerate parametric oscillator above threshold shows squeezing in the amplitude difference quadrature. The first experimental demonstration of two-mode squeezing in optics was by Heidmann et al.. More recently, two-mode squeezing was generated on-chip using a four-wave mixing OPO above threshold. Two-mode squeezing is often seen as a precursor to continuous-variable entanglement, and hence a demonstration of the Einstein-Podolsky-Rosen paradox in its original formulation in terms of continuous position and momentum observables. A two-mode squeezed vacuum (TMSV) state can be mathematically represented as,

$$|\text{TMSV}\rangle =  S_2(\zeta)|0,0\rangle = \exp(\zeta^* \hat a \hat b - \zeta \hat a^\dagger \hat b^\dagger) |0,0\rangle$$,

and, writing down $\zeta = r e^{i\phi}$, in the photon number basis as,

$$|\text{TMSV}\rangle = \frac{1}{\cosh r} \sum_{n=0}^\infty (-e^{i \phi}\tanh r)^n  |nn\rangle$$

If the individual modes of a TMSV are considered separately (i.e., $|nn\rangle=|n\rangle_1 |n\rangle_2$), then tracing over or absorbing one of the modes leaves the remaining mode in a thermal state

$$\begin{align}\rho_1 &= \mathrm{Tr}_2 [| \mathrm{TMSV} \rangle \langle \mathrm{TMSV} | ]\\ &= \frac{1}{\cosh^2(r)} \sum_{n=0}^\infty \tanh^{2n}(r)
|n \rangle \langle n|, \end{align}$$

with an effective average number of photons $\widetilde{n} = \sinh^2(r)$.

=== Based on the presence of a mean field ===
Squeezed states of light can be divided into squeezed vacuum and bright squeezed light, depending on the absence or presence of a non-zero mean field (also called a carrier), respectively. An optical parametric oscillator operated below threshold produces squeezed vacuum, whereas the same OPO operated above threshold produces bright squeezed light. Bright squeezed light can be advantageous for certain quantum information processing applications as it obviates the need of sending local oscillator to provide a phase reference, whereas squeezed vacuum is considered more suitable for quantum enhanced sensing applications. The AdLIGO and GEO600 gravitational wave detectors use squeezed vacuum to achieve enhanced sensitivity beyond the standard quantum limit.

== Atomic spin squeezing ==
For squeezing of two-level neutral atom ensembles it is useful to consider the atoms as spin-1/2 particles with corresponding angular momentum operators defined as

$$J_v=\sum_{i=1}^N j_v^{(i)}$$

where $v={x,y,z}$ and $j_v^{(i)}$ is the single-spin operator in the $v$-direction. Here $J_z$ will correspond to the population difference in the two level system, i.e. for an equal superposition of the up and down state $J_z=0$. The $J_x$−$J_y$ plane represents the phase difference between the two states. This is also known as the Bloch sphere picture. We can then define uncertainty relations such as $\Delta J_z \cdot \Delta J_y \geq \left|\Delta J_x\right|/2$. For a coherent (unentangled) state, $\Delta J_z=\Delta J_y=\sqrt{N}/2$. Squeezing is here considered the redistribution of uncertainty from one variable (typically $J_z$) to another (typically $J_y$). If we consider a state pointing in the $J_x$ direction, we can define the Wineland criterion for squeezing, or the metrological enhancement of the squeezed state as

$$\chi^2=\left(\frac{\sqrt{N}/2}{\Delta J_z}\frac{\left|J_x\right|}{N/2}\right)^2$$.

This criterion has two factors, the first factor is the spin noise reduction, i.e. how much the quantum noise in $J_z$ is reduced relative to the coherent (unentangled) state. The second factor is how much the coherence (the length of the Bloch vector, $\left|J_x\right|$) is reduced due to the squeezing procedure. Together these quantities tell you how much metrological enhancement the squeezing procedure gives. Here, metrological enhancement is the reduction in averaging time or atom number needed to make a measurement of a specific uncertainty. 20 dB of metrological enhancement means the same precision measurement can be made with 100 times fewer atoms or 100 times shorter averaging time.

== Relation with the concept of quantum phase space ==
The concept of Quantum Phase Space (QPS) extends the notion of phase space from classical to quantum physics by taking into account the uncertainty principle. The definition of the QPS is based on the introduction of joint momentum-coordinate quantum states denoted $|\langle z \rangle\rangle$ which can be considered as some kind of squeezed coherent states. The expression of the wavefunction corresponding to a state $|\langle z \rangle\rangle$ in coordinate representation is

$\varphi(x)=\langle x|\langle z\rangle\rangle =\frac{e^{- \frac{B}{(\hbar)^2}(x-\langle x\rangle)^2+\frac{i}{\hbar}\langle p \rangle x}}{(2\pi A)^\tfrac{1}{4}}$

in which :

- $\hbar$ is the reduced Planck constant
- $x$ and $p$ are respectively the eigenvalues (possible values) of the coordinate operator $X$ and the momentum operator $P$
- $\langle x\rangle$ , $\langle p\rangle$, $A$ and $B$ are respectively the mean values and statistical variances of the coordinate and momentum corresponding to the quantum state $|\langle z \rangle\rangle$ itself

$$\begin{cases} \langle x\rangle = \langle \langle z \rangle|X|\langle z\rangle\rangle \\ \langle p\rangle = \langle \langle z \rangle|P|\langle z \rangle \rangle \\ A=\langle \langle z\rangle|(X-\langle x\rangle)^2|\langle z \rangle \rangle \\ B =\langle \langle z \rangle|(P-\langle p\rangle)^2|\langle z \rangle\rangle \end{cases}$$

A state $|\langle z \rangle\rangle$ saturates the uncertainty relation i.e. one has the following relation

$\sqrt{A} \sqrt{B}=\frac{\hbar}{2}$

It can be shown that a state $|\langle z \rangle\rangle$ is an eigenstate of the operator $Z=P - \frac{2i}{\hbar}BX$. The corresponding eigenvalue equation is

$Z|\langle z \rangle\rangle =\langle z \rangle|\langle z \rangle\rangle$

with

$\langle z \rangle = \langle p \rangle - \frac{2i}{\hbar} B\langle x\rangle$

It was also shown that the multidimensional generalization of the states $|\langle z \rangle\rangle$ are the basic quantum states which corresponds to wavefunctions that are covariants under the action of the group formed by multidimensional Linear Canonical Transformations.

The quantum phase space (QPS) is defined as the set $\{\langle z\rangle\}$ of all possible values of $\langle z\rangle$ , or equivalently as the set $\{(\langle p \rangle ,\langle x\rangle)\}$ of possible values of the pair $(\langle p \rangle ,\langle x\rangle)$, for a given value of the momentum statistical variance $B$. It follows from this definition that the structure of the quantum phase space depends explicitly on the value of the momentum statistical variance. It is this explicit dependence that makes this definition naturally compatible with the uncertainty principle. It can also be remarked here that, at thermodynamic equilibrium, the momentum statistical variance $B$ can be related to thermodynamics parameters like temperature, pressure and volume shape and size. At the classical limit, when the momentum and coordinate statistical variances are taken to be equal to zero (ignoring the uncertainty principle), the quantum phase space as defined previously is reduced to the classical phase space.

There are more generalized squeezed coherent states, denoted $|n,\langle z \rangle\rangle$ with $n$ a positive integer, that are related to the concept of QPS and which do not saturate the uncertainty relation for $n>0$. These states can be deduced from to the states $|\langle z \rangle\rangle$ using the following relation

$|n,\langle z \rangle\rangle =\frac{1}{\sqrt{n!}}[\frac{-i(Z-\langle z\rangle)^\dagger}{2\sqrt{B}}]^n |\langle z \rangle\rangle$

The coordinate and momentum statistical variances, denoted respectively $A_n$ and $B_n$, corresponding to a state $|n,\langle z \rangle\rangle$ are

$$\begin{cases}A_n =\langle n, \langle z \rangle|(X-\langle x \rangle)^2|n, \langle z \rangle\rangle =(2n+1)A \\B_n =\langle n, \langle z \rangle|(P-\langle p\rangle)^2|n,\langle z \rangle \rangle=(2n+1)B  \end{cases}$$

We then have the following relation

$\sqrt{A_n}\sqrt{B_n}=(2n+1)\frac{\hbar}{2}\geq \frac{\hbar}{2}$

This relation shows that a state $|n,\langle z \rangle\rangle$ does not saturate the uncertainty relation for $n>0$ as said before.

== Experimental realizations ==
There has been a whole variety of successful demonstrations of squeezed states. The first demonstrations were experiments with light fields using lasers and non-linear optics (see optical parametric oscillator). This is achieved by a simple process of four-wave mixing with a $\chi^{(2)}$ crystal; similarly travelling wave phase-sensitive amplifiers generate spatially multimode quadrature-squeezed states of light when the $\chi^{(2)}$ crystal is pumped in absence of any signal. Sub-Poissonian current sources driving semiconductor laser diodes have led to amplitude squeezed light.

Squeezed states have also been realized via motional states of an ion in a trap, phonon states in crystal lattices, and spin states in neutral atom ensembles. Much progress has been made on the creation and observation of spin squeezed states in ensembles of neutral atoms and ions, which can be used to enhancement measurements of time, accelerations, fields, and the current state of the art for measurement enhancement is 20 dB. Generation of spin squeezed states have been demonstrated using both coherent evolution of a coherent spin state and projective, coherence-preserving measurements. Even macroscopic oscillators were driven into classical motional states that were very similar to squeezed coherent states. Current state of the art in noise suppression, for laser radiation using squeezed light, amounts to 15 dB (as of 2016), which broke the previous record of 12.7 dB (2010).

== Applications ==
Squeezed states of the light field can be used to enhance precision measurements. For example, phase-squeezed light can improve the phase read out of interferometric measurements (see for example gravitational waves). Amplitude-squeezed light can improve the readout of very weak spectroscopic signals.

Spin squeezed states of atoms can be used to improve the precision of atomic clocks. This is an important problem in atomic clocks and other sensors that use small ensembles of cold atoms where the quantum projection noise represents a fundamental limitation to the precision of the sensor.

Various squeezed coherent states, generalized to the case of many degrees of freedom, are used in various calculations in quantum field theory, for example Unruh effect and Hawking radiation, and generally, particle production in curved backgrounds and Bogoliubov transformations.

Recently, the use of squeezed states for quantum information processing in the continuous variables (CV) regime has been increasing rapidly. Continuous variable quantum optics uses squeezing of light as an essential resource to realize CV protocols for quantum communication, unconditional quantum teleportation and one-way quantum computing. This is in contrast to quantum information processing with single photons or photon pairs as qubits. CV quantum information processing relies heavily on the fact that squeezing is intimately related to quantum entanglement, as the quadratures of a squeezed state exhibit sub-shot-noise quantum correlations.

== See also ==
- Negative energy
- Nonclassical light
- Optical phase space
- Quantum optics
- Squeeze operator
