= Lieb conjecture =

Theorem in quantum information theory

In quantum information theory, the Lieb conjecture is a theorem concerning the Wehrl entropy of quantum systems for which the classical phase space is a sphere. It states that no state of such a system has a lower Wehrl entropy than the SU(2) coherent states.

The analogous property for quantum systems for which the classical phase space is a plane was conjectured by Alfred Wehrl in 1978 and proven soon afterwards by Elliott H. Lieb, who at the same time extended it to the SU(2) case. The conjecture was proven in 2012, by Lieb and Jan Philip Solovej. The uniqueness of the minimizers was only proved in 2022 by Rupert L. Frank and Aleksei Kulikov, Fabio Nicola, Joaquim Ortega-Cerda' and Paolo Tilli.
