= Quantum algebra =

Category of mathematics papers in ArXiv

In mathematics, quantum algebra is the study of noncommutative analogues and generalizations of commutative algebras, especially those arising in Lie theory.. It is one of the top-level mathematics categories used by the arXiv, and is a unification of algebraic deformations, Hopf algebras, category theory, topology, noncommutative geometry, and quantum groups within quantum mechanics and quantum field theory.

Subjects include:

- Quantum groups
- Skein theories
- Operadic algebra
- Diagrammatic algebra
- Quantum field theory
- Racks and quandles

== See also ==
- Coherent states in mathematical physics
- Glossary of areas of mathematics
- Mathematics Subject Classification
- Ordered type system, a substructural type system
- Outline of mathematics
- Quantum logic
