= Displacement operator =

Mathematical operator in quantum optics

In the quantum mechanics study of optical phase space, the displacement operator for one mode is the shift operator in quantum optics,

$$\hat{D}(\alpha)=\exp \left ( \alpha \hat{a}^\dagger - \alpha^\ast \hat{a} \right )$$,

where $\alpha$ is the amount of displacement in optical phase space, $\alpha^*$ is the complex conjugate of that displacement, and $\hat{a}$ and $\hat{a}^\dagger$ are the lowering and raising operators, respectively.

The name of this operator is derived from its ability to displace a localized state in phase space by a magnitude $\alpha$. It may also act on the vacuum state by displacing it into a coherent state. Specifically, $\hat{D}(\alpha)|0\rangle=|\alpha\rangle$ where $|\alpha\rangle$ is a coherent state, which is an eigenstate of the annihilation (lowering) operator. This operator was introduced independently by Richard Feynman and Roy J. Glauber in 1951.

== Properties ==
The displacement operator is a unitary operator, and therefore obeys $\hat{D}(\alpha)\hat{D}^\dagger(\alpha)=\hat{D}^\dagger(\alpha)\hat{D}(\alpha)=\hat{1}$, where $\hat{1}$ is the identity operator. Since $\hat{D}^\dagger(\alpha)=\hat{D}(-\alpha)$, the hermitian conjugate of the displacement operator can also be interpreted as a displacement of opposite magnitude ($-\alpha$). The effect of applying this operator in a similarity transformation of the ladder operators results in their displacement.

$$\hat{D}^\dagger(\alpha) \hat{a} \hat{D}(\alpha)=\hat{a}+\alpha$$
$$\hat{D}(\alpha) \hat{a} \hat{D}^\dagger(\alpha)=\hat{a}-\alpha$$

The product of two displacement operators is another displacement operator whose total displacement, up to a phase factor, is the sum of the two individual displacements. This can be seen by utilizing the Baker–Campbell–Hausdorff formula.

$$e^{\alpha \hat{a}^{\dagger} - \alpha^*\hat{a}} e^{\beta\hat{a}^{\dagger} - \beta^*\hat{a}} = e^{(\alpha + \beta)\hat{a}^{\dagger} - (\beta^*+\alpha^*)\hat{a}} e^{(\alpha\beta^*-\alpha^*\beta)/2}.$$

which shows us that:

$$\hat{D}(\alpha)\hat{D}(\beta)= e^{(\alpha\beta^*-\alpha^*\beta)/2} \hat{D}(\alpha + \beta)$$

When acting on an eigenket, the phase factor $e^{(\alpha\beta^*-\alpha^*\beta)/2}$ appears in each term of the resulting state, which makes it physically irrelevant.

It further leads to the braiding relation

$$\hat{D}(\alpha)\hat{D}(\beta)=e^{\alpha\beta^*-\alpha^*\beta} \hat{D}(\beta)\hat{D}(\alpha)$$

== Alternative expressions ==
The Kermack–McCrea identity (named after William Ogilvy Kermack and William McCrea) gives two alternative ways to express the displacement operator:

$$\hat{D}(\alpha)  = e^{ -\frac{1}{2} | \alpha |^2  } e^{+\alpha \hat{a}^{\dagger}} e^{-\alpha^{*} \hat{a} }$$

$$\hat{D}(\alpha)  = e^{ +\frac{1}{2} | \alpha |^2  } e^{-\alpha^{*} \hat{a} }e^{+\alpha \hat{a}^{\dagger}}$$

In the Cahill-Glauber $s$-order representation we can write some useful definitions of these forms of the displacement operator.

$$\hat{D}_{\text{symmetric}}(\alpha)
\equiv \hat{D}_{0}(\alpha)
\equiv \hat{D}(\alpha)
= e^{+\alpha \hat{a}^{\dagger} -\alpha^{*} \hat{a} }$$
$$\hat{D}_{\text{normal}}(\alpha)
\equiv \hat{D}_{+1}(\alpha)
\equiv e^{+\alpha \hat{a}^{\dagger}} e^{-\alpha^{*} \hat{a} }$$
$$\hat{D}_{\text{anti-normal}}(\alpha)
\equiv \hat{D}_{-1}(\alpha)
\equiv e^{-\alpha^{*} \hat{a} }e^{+\alpha \hat{a}^{\dagger}}$$

With the generalization:

$$\hat{D}_{s}(\alpha)
\equiv \hat{D_0}(\alpha) e^{\frac{s}{2}|\alpha|^2}
= e^{+\alpha \hat{a}^{\dagger} -\alpha^{*} \hat{a} } e^{\frac{s}{2}|\alpha|^2}$$

== Relationship to the Symmetric Delta Function ==
The displacement operator is the fourier transform of the symmetric delta function

$$\hat{T}_0 (\alpha)
\equiv \pi \delta^{(2)}_0(\hat{a}-\alpha, \hat{a}^\dagger - \alpha^*)
= \int \frac{d^2 \beta}{\pi} \hat{D}_0(\beta) e^{\beta^* \alpha - \beta \alpha^*}$$

This is extended to the generally ordered delta function:

$$\hat{T}_s (\alpha) \equiv \pi \delta^{(2)}_s(\hat{a}-\alpha, \hat{a}^\dagger - \alpha^*)
= \int \frac{d^2 \beta}{\pi} \hat{D}_s(\beta) e^{\beta^* \alpha - \beta \alpha^*}$$

Example: Normal ordered delta function

$$\begin{aligned}
\hat{T}_{+1}(\alpha)
&= \int \frac{d^2 \beta}{\pi} \hat{D}_{+1}(\beta) e^{\beta^* \alpha - \beta \alpha^*}\\
&= \int \frac{d^2 \beta}{\pi} e^{\hat{a}^\dagger \beta} e^{-\hat{a} \beta^*} e^{\beta^* \alpha - \beta \alpha^*} \\
&= \int \frac{d^2 \beta}{\pi} e^{(\hat{a}^\dagger - \alpha^*) \beta} e^{(\alpha-\hat{a}) \beta^*}  \\
&= \frac{1}{\pi} \left[ \pi \delta^{(1)}(\hat{a}^\dagger - \alpha^*) \right] \left[ \pi \delta^{(1)}(\hat{a} - \alpha) \right] \\
&= \pi \delta^{(2)}_{+1}(\hat{a}-\alpha, \hat{a}^\dagger - \alpha^*)
\end{aligned}$$

== Multimode displacement ==
The displacement operator can also be generalized to multimode displacement. A multimode creation operator can be defined as

$$\hat A_{\psi}^{\dagger}=\int d\mathbf{k}\psi(\mathbf{k})\hat a^{\dagger}(\mathbf{k})$$,

where $\mathbf{k}$ is the wave vector and its magnitude is related to the frequency $\omega_{\mathbf{k}}$ according to $|\mathbf{k}|=\omega_{\mathbf{k}}/c$. Using this definition, we can write the multimode displacement operator as

$$\hat{D}_{\psi}(\alpha)=\exp \left ( \alpha \hat A_{\psi}^{\dagger} - \alpha^\ast \hat A_{\psi} \right )$$,

and define the multimode coherent state as

$$|\alpha_{\psi}\rangle\equiv\hat{D}_{\psi}(\alpha)|0\rangle$$.

== See also ==
- Optical phase space
