= Coherent state =

Specific quantum state of a quantum harmonic oscillator

In physics, specifically in quantum mechanics, a coherent state is the specific quantum state of the quantum harmonic oscillator, often described as a state that has dynamics most closely resembling the oscillatory behavior of a classical harmonic oscillator. It was the first example of quantum dynamics when Erwin Schrödinger derived it in 1926, while searching for solutions of the Schrödinger equation that satisfy the correspondence principle. The quantum harmonic oscillator (and hence the coherent states) arise in the quantum theory of a wide range of physical systems. For instance, a coherent state describes the oscillating motion of a particle confined in a quadratic potential well (for an early reference, see e.g. Schiff's textbook). The coherent state describes a state in a system for which the ground-state wavepacket is displaced from the origin of the system. This state can be related to classical solutions by a particle oscillating with an amplitude equivalent to the displacement.

These states, expressed as eigenvectors of the lowering operator and forming an overcomplete family, were introduced in the early papers of John R. Klauder, e.g. In the quantum theory of light (quantum electrodynamics) and other bosonic quantum field theories, coherent states were introduced by the work of Roy J. Glauber in 1963 and are also known as Glauber states.

The concept of coherent states has been considerably abstracted; it has become a major topic in mathematical physics and in applied mathematics, with applications ranging from quantization to signal processing and image processing (see Coherent states in mathematical physics). For this reason, the coherent states associated to the quantum harmonic oscillator are sometimes referred to as canonical coherent states (CCS), standard coherent states, Gaussian states, or oscillator states.

== Coherent states in quantum optics ==
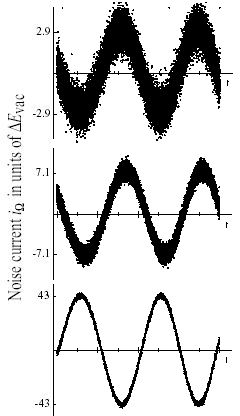
Figure 1: The electric field, measured by optical homodyne detection, as a function of phase for three coherent states emitted by a Nd:YAG laser. The amount of quantum noise in the electric field is completely independent of the phase. As the field strength, i.e. the oscillation amplitude α of the coherent state is increased, the quantum noise or uncertainty is constant at 1/2, and so becomes less and less significant. In the limit of large field the state becomes a good approximation of a noiseless stable classical wave. The average photon numbers of the three states from top to bottom are ⟨n⟩=4.2, 25.2, 924.5

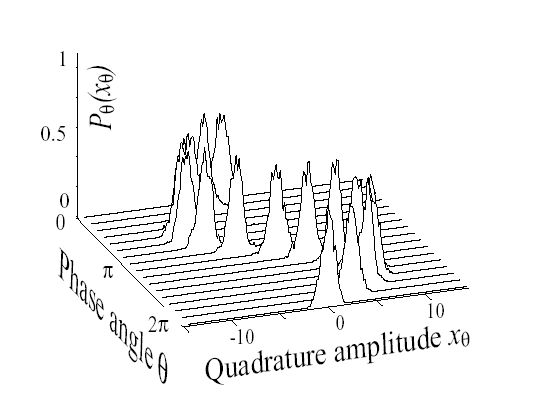
Figure 2: The oscillating wave packet corresponding to the second coherent state depicted in Figure 1. At each phase of the light field, the distribution is a Gaussian of constant width.

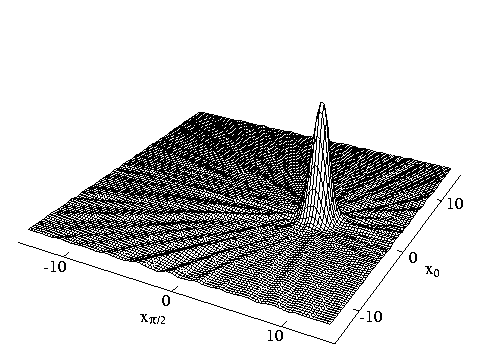
Figure 3: Wigner function of the coherent state depicted in Figure 2. The distribution is centered on state's amplitude α and is symmetric around this point. The ripples are due to experimental errors.

In quantum optics the coherent state refers to a state of the quantized electromagnetic field, etc. that describes a maximal kind of coherence and a classical kind of behavior. Erwin Schrödinger derived it as a "minimum uncertainty" Gaussian wavepacket in 1926, searching for solutions of the Schrödinger equation that satisfy the correspondence principle. It is a minimum uncertainty state, with the single free parameter chosen to make the relative dispersion (standard deviation in natural dimensionless units) equal for position and momentum, each being equally small at high energy.

Further, in contrast to the energy eigenstates of the system, the time evolution of a coherent state is concentrated along the classical trajectories. The quantum linear harmonic oscillator, and hence coherent states, arise in the quantum theory of a wide range of physical systems. They occur in the quantum theory of light (quantum electrodynamics) and other bosonic quantum field theories.

While minimum uncertainty Gaussian wave-packets had been well-known, they did not attract full attention until Roy J. Glauber, in 1963, provided a complete quantum-theoretic description of coherence in the electromagnetic field. In this respect, the concurrent contribution of E.C.G. Sudarshan should not be omitted, (there is, however, a note in Glauber's paper that reads: "Uses of these states as generating functions for the $n$-quantum states have, however, been made by J. Schwinger). Glauber was prompted to do this to provide a description of the Hanbury Brown and Twiss experiment, which generated very wide baseline (hundreds or thousands of miles) interference patterns that could be used to determine stellar diameters. This opened the door to a much more comprehensive understanding of coherence. (For more, see Quantum mechanical description.)

In classical optics, light is thought of as electromagnetic waves radiating from a source. Often, coherent laser light is thought of as light that is emitted by many such sources that are in phase. Actually, the picture of one photon being in-phase with another is not valid in quantum theory. Laser radiation is produced in a resonant cavity where the resonant frequency of the cavity is the same as the frequency associated with the atomic electron transitions providing energy flow into the field. As energy in the resonant mode builds up, the probability for stimulated emission, in that mode only, increases. That is a positive feedback loop in which the amplitude in the resonant mode increases exponentially until some nonlinear effects limit it. As a counter-example, a light bulb radiates light into a continuum of modes, and there is nothing that selects any one mode over the other. The emission process is highly random in space and time (see thermal light). In a laser, however, light is emitted into a resonant mode, and that mode is highly coherent. Thus, laser light is idealized as a coherent state. (Classically we describe such a state by an electric field oscillating as a stable wave. See Fig.1)

Besides describing lasers, coherent states also behave in a convenient manner when describing the quantum action of beam splitters: two coherent-state input beams will simply convert to two coherent-state beams at the output with new amplitudes given by classical electromagnetic wave formulas; such a simple behaviour does not occur for other input states, including number states. Likewise if a coherent-state light beam is partially absorbed, then the remainder is a pure coherent state with a smaller amplitude, whereas partial absorption of non-coherent-state light produces a more complicated statistical mixed state. Thermal light can be described as a statistical mixture of coherent states, and the typical way of defining nonclassical light is that it cannot be described as a simple statistical mixture of coherent states.

The energy eigenstates of the linear harmonic oscillator (e.g., masses on springs, lattice vibrations in a solid, vibrational motions of nuclei in molecules, or oscillations in the electromagnetic field) are fixed-number quantum states. The Fock state (e.g. a single photon) is the most particle-like state; it has a fixed number of particles, and phase is indeterminate. A coherent state distributes its quantum-mechanical uncertainty equally between the canonically conjugate coordinates, position and momentum, and the relative uncertainty in phase [defined heuristically] and amplitude are roughly equal—and small at high amplitude.

== Quantum mechanical definition ==
Mathematically, a coherent state $|\alpha\rangle$ is defined to be the (unique) eigenstate of the annihilation operator â with corresponding eigenvalue $\alpha$. Formally, this reads,

$$\hat{a}|\alpha\rangle=\alpha|\alpha\rangle  ~.$$

Since â is not hermitian, $\alpha$ is, in general, a complex number. Writing $\alpha = |\alpha|e^{i\theta}$, $|\alpha|$ and θ are called the amplitude and phase of the state $|\alpha\rangle$.

The state $|\alpha\rangle$ is called a canonical coherent state in the literature, since there are many other types of coherent states, as can be seen in the companion article Coherent states in mathematical physics.

Physically, this formula means that a coherent state remains unchanged by the annihilation of field excitation or, say, a charged particle. An eigenstate of the annihilation operator has a Poissonian number distribution when expressed in a basis of energy eigenstates, as shown below. A Poisson distribution is a necessary and sufficient condition that all detections are statistically independent. Contrast this to a single-particle state ($|1\rangle$ Fock state): once one particle is detected, there is zero probability of detecting another.

The derivation of this will make use of (unconventionally normalized) dimensionless operators, X and P, normally called field quadratures in quantum optics. (See Nondimensionalization.) These operators are related to the position and momentum operators of a mass m on a spring with constant k,

$${P}=\sqrt{\frac{1}{2\hbar m\omega }}\ \hat{p}\text{,}\quad  {X}=\sqrt{\frac{m\omega }{2\hbar }}\ \hat{x}\text{,}\quad \quad \text{where }\omega \equiv \sqrt{k/m}~.$$

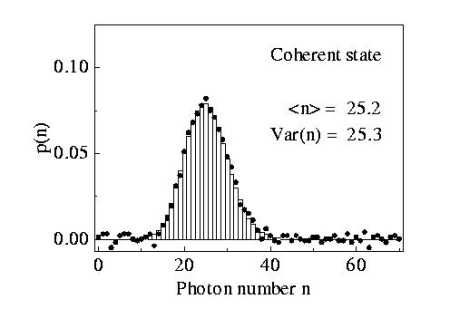
Figure 4: The probability of detecting n photons, the photon number distribution, of the coherent state in Figure 3. As is necessary for a Poissonian distribution the mean photon number is equal to the variance of the photon number distribution. Bars refer to theory, dots to experimental values.

For an optical field,

$$~E_{\rm R} =
\left(\frac{2\hbar\omega}{\epsilon_0 V}
\right)^{1/2} \!\!\!\cos(\theta) X \qquad \text{and} \qquad ~E_{\rm I} =
\left(\frac{2\hbar\omega}{\epsilon_0 V}\right)^{1/2} \!\!\!\sin(\theta) X~$$

are the real and imaginary components of the mode of the electric field inside a cavity of volume $V$.

With these (dimensionless) operators, the Hamiltonian of either system becomes

$${H}=\hbar \omega \left({P}^{2}+{X}^{2} \right)\text{,}
\qquad\text{with}\qquad
\left[ {X},{P} \right]\equiv {XP}-{PX}=\frac{i}{2}\,{I}.$$

Erwin Schrödinger was searching for the most classical-like states when he first introduced minimum uncertainty Gaussian wave-packets. The quantum state of the harmonic oscillator that minimizes the uncertainty relation with uncertainty equally distributed between X and P satisfies the equation

$$\left( {X}-\langle {X}\rangle \right)\,|\alpha \rangle  = -i\left( {P}-\langle{P}\rangle \right)\, |\alpha\rangle \text{,}$$

or, equivalently,

$$\left( {X}+i{P} \right)\, \left|\alpha\right\rangle  = \left\langle {X}+i{P} \right\rangle \, \left|\alpha\right\rangle ~,$$

and hence

$$\langle \alpha \! \mid   \left( {X}-\langle X\rangle \right)^2+  \left( {P}-\langle P\rangle \right)^2   \mid \!\alpha\rangle  = 1 ~.$$

Thus, given (∆X−∆P)^{2} ≥ 0, Schrödinger found that the minimum uncertainty states for the linear harmonic oscillator are the eigenstates of (X + iP). Since â is (X + iP), this is recognizable as a coherent state in the sense of the above definition.

Using the notation for multi-photon states, Glauber characterized the state of complete coherence to all orders in the electromagnetic field to be the eigenstate of the annihilation operator—formally, in a mathematical sense, the same state as found by Schrödinger. The name coherent state took hold after Glauber's work.

If the uncertainty is minimized, but not necessarily equally balanced between X and P, the state is called a squeezed coherent state.

The coherent state's location in the complex plane (phase space) is centered at the position and momentum of a classical oscillator of the phase θ and amplitude |α| given by the eigenvalue α (or the same complex electric field value for an electromagnetic wave). As shown in Figure 5, the uncertainty, equally spread in all directions, is represented by a disk with diameter 1/2. As the phase varies, the coherent state circles around the origin and the disk neither distorts nor spreads. This is the most similar a quantum state can be to a single point in phase space.

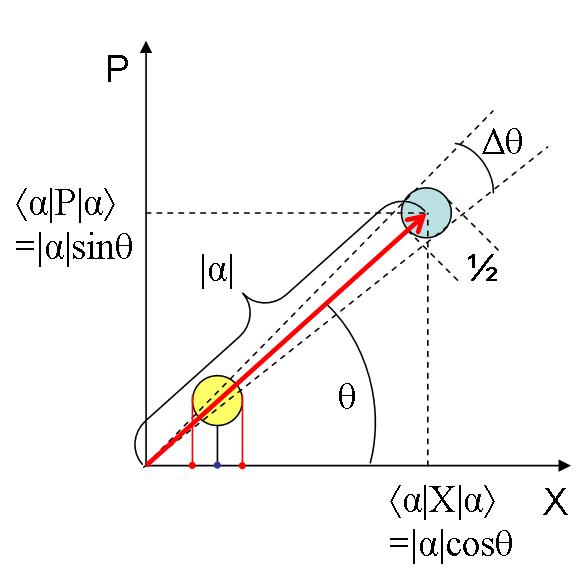
Figure 5: Phase space plot of a coherent state. This shows that the uncertainty in a coherent state is equally distributed in all directions. The horizontal and vertical axes are the X and P quadratures of the field, respectively (see text). The red dots on the x-axis trace out the boundaries of the quantum noise in Figure 1. For more detail, see the corresponding figure of the phase space formulation.

Since the uncertainty (and hence measurement noise) stays constant at 1/2 as the amplitude of the oscillation increases, the state behaves increasingly like a sinusoidal wave, as shown in Figure 1. Moreover, since the vacuum state $|0\rangle$ is just the coherent state with α=0, all coherent states have the same uncertainty as the vacuum. Therefore, one may interpret the quantum noise of a coherent state as being due to vacuum fluctuations.

The notation $|\alpha\rangle$ does not refer to a Fock state. For example, when α = 1, one should not mistake $|1\rangle$ for the single-photon Fock state, which is also denoted $|1\rangle$ in its own notation. The expression $|\alpha\rangle$ with α = 1 represents a Poisson distribution of number states $|n\rangle$ with a mean photon number of unity.

The formal solution of the eigenvalue equation is the vacuum state displaced to a location α in phase space, i.e., it is obtained by letting the unitary displacement operator D(α) operate on the vacuum,

$$|\alpha\rangle=e^{\alpha \hat a^\dagger - \alpha^*\hat a}|0\rangle = D(\alpha)|0\rangle$$,

where â = X + iP and â^{†} = X - iP.

This can be easily seen, as can virtually all results involving coherent states, using the representation of the coherent state in the basis of Fock states,

$$|\alpha\rangle =e^{-{|\alpha|^2\over2}}\sum_{n=0}^{\infty}{\alpha^n\over\sqrt{n!}}|n\rangle =e^{-{|\alpha|^2\over2}}e^{\alpha\hat a^\dagger}e^{-{\alpha^* \hat a}}|0\rangle =e^{\alpha \hat a^\dagger - \alpha^*\hat a}|0\rangle = D(\alpha)|0\rangle ~,$$

where $|n\rangle$ are energy (number) eigenvectors of the Hamiltonian

$$H =\hbar \omega \left( \hat a^\dagger \hat a + \frac 12\right)~,$$

and the final equality derives from the Baker-Campbell-Hausdorff formula. For the corresponding Poissonian distribution, the probability of detecting n photons is

$$P(n)= |\langle n|\alpha \rangle |^2 =e^{-\langle n \rangle}\frac{\langle n \rangle^n}{n!}    ~.$$

Similarly, the average photon number in a coherent state is

$$~\langle n \rangle =\langle \hat a^\dagger \hat a \rangle =|\alpha|^2~$$

and the variance is

$$~(\Delta n)^2={\rm Var}\left(\hat a^\dagger \hat a\right)=
|\alpha|^2~$$.

That is, the standard deviation of the number detected goes like the square root of the number detected. So in the limit of large α, these detection statistics are equivalent to that of a classical stable wave.

These results apply to detection results at a single detector and thus relate to first order coherence (see degree of coherence). However, for measurements correlating detections at multiple detectors, higher-order coherence is involved (e.g., intensity correlations, second order coherence, at two detectors). Glauber's definition of quantum coherence involves nth-order correlation functions (n-th order coherence) for all n. The perfect coherent state has all n-orders of correlation equal to 1 (coherent). It is perfectly coherent to all orders.

The second-order correlation coefficient $g^2(0)$ gives a direct measure of the degree of coherence of photon states in terms of the variance of the photon statistics in the beam under study.

$$~g^2(0) =1+\frac{{\rm Var}\left(\hat a^\dagger \hat a\right)-\langle \hat a^\dagger \hat a \rangle}{(\langle \hat a^\dagger \hat a \rangle)^2} = 1+\frac{{\rm Var}(n)-\bar{n}}{\bar{n}^2}$$

In Glauber's development, it is seen that the coherent states are distributed according to a Poisson distribution. In the case of a Poisson distribution, the variance is equal to the mean, i.e.

$${\rm Var}(n) =\bar{n}$$
$$g^2(0) = 1$$.

A second-order correlation coefficient of 1 means that photons in coherent states are uncorrelated.

Hanbury Brown and Twiss studied the correlation behavior of photons emitted from a thermal, incoherent source described by Bose–Einstein statistics. The variance of the Bose–Einstein distribution is

$${\rm Var(n)}=\bar{n}+\bar{n}^2$$
$$g^2(0) = 2$$.

This corresponds to the correlation measurements of Hanbury Brown and Twiss, and illustrates that photons in incoherent Bose–Einstein states are correlated or bunched.

Quanta that obey Fermi–Dirac statistics are anti-correlated. In this case the variance is

$${\rm Var}(n)=\bar{n}-\bar{n}^2$$
$$g^2(0) = 0$$.

Anti-correlation is characterized by a second-order correlation coefficient =0.

Roy J. Glauber's work was prompted by the results of Hanbury Brown and Twiss that produced long-range (hundreds or thousands of miles) first-order interference patterns through the use of intensity fluctuations (lack of second order coherence), with narrow band filters (partial first order coherence) at each detector. (One can imagine, over very short durations, a near-instantaneous interference pattern from the two detectors, due to the narrow band filters, that dances around randomly due to the shifting relative phase difference. With a coincidence counter, the dancing interference pattern would be stronger at times of increased intensity [common to both beams], and that pattern would be stronger than the background noise.) Almost all of optics had been concerned with first order coherence. The Hanbury Brown and Twiss results prompted Glauber to look at higher order coherence, and he came up with a complete quantum-theoretic description of coherence to all orders in the electromagnetic field (and a quantum-theoretic description of signal-plus-noise). He coined the term coherent state and showed that they are produced when a classical electric current interacts with the electromagnetic field.

At α ≫ 1, from Figure 5, simple geometry gives Δθ |α | = 1/2. From this, it appears that there is a tradeoff between number uncertainty and phase uncertainty, Δθ Δn = 1/2, which is sometimes interpreted as a number-phase uncertainty relation; but this is not a formal strict uncertainty relation: there is no uniquely defined phase operator in quantum mechanics.

== The wavefunction of a coherent state ==
Coherent state dynamics for $\alpha = \sqrt{10}$, in units of the harmonic oscillator length $x_0=\sqrt{\hbar/m\omega}$, showing the probability density $|\psi(x,t)|^2$ and the quantum phase (color).

To find the wavefunction of the coherent state, the minimal uncertainty Schrödinger wave packet, it is easiest to start with the Heisenberg picture of the quantum harmonic oscillator for the coherent state $|\alpha\rangle$. Note that

$$~a(t)|\alpha\rangle =e^{-i\omega t}a(0)|\alpha\rangle$$

The coherent state is an eigenstate of the annihilation operator in the Heisenberg picture.

It is easy to see that, in the Schrödinger picture, the same eigenvalue

$$~ \alpha(t) = e^{-i\omega t}\alpha(0)~$$

occurs,

$$~a|\alpha(t)\rangle=\alpha(t)|\alpha(t)\rangle$$.

In the coordinate representations resulting from operating by $\langle x|$, this amounts to the differential equation,

$$~\sqrt{\frac{m \omega}{2 \hbar}}\left(x+\frac{\hbar}{m\omega}\frac{\partial }{\partial x}\right)\psi^\alpha(x,t)=\alpha(t)\psi^\alpha(x,t)  ~,$$

which is easily solved to yield

$$~\psi^{(\alpha)}(x,t)=\left(\frac{m\omega}{\pi\hbar}\right)^{1/4} \exp \Bigg( -\frac{m\omega}{2\hbar}\left(x-\sqrt{\frac{2\hbar}{m\omega}}\Re[\alpha(t)]\right)^2+i\sqrt{\frac{2m\omega}{\hbar}}\Im[\alpha(t)]x+i\theta(t) \Bigg) ~  ,$$

where θ(t) is a yet undetermined phase, to be fixed by demanding that the wavefunction satisfies the Schrödinger equation.

It follows that

$$~\theta(t)=-\frac{\omega t}{2}+\frac{|\alpha(0)|^2\sin(2\omega t-2\sigma)}{2}    ~, \text{where} \qquad        \alpha(0)\equiv|\alpha(0)|\exp(i\sigma)  ~,$$

so that σ is the initial phase of the eigenvalue.

The mean position and momentum of this "minimal Schrödinger wave packet" $\psi^{(\alpha)}$ are thus oscillating just like a classical system,

$\langle \hat{x}(t) \rangle = \sqrt{\frac{2\hbar}{m\omega}}\Re[\alpha(t)]= |\alpha(0)| \sqrt{\frac{2\hbar}{m\omega}} \cos (\sigma - \omega t)~,$

$\langle \hat{p}(t) \rangle = \sqrt{2m\hbar\omega}\Im[\alpha(t)]= |\alpha(0)|\sqrt{2m\hbar\omega} \sin (\sigma - \omega t)~.$

The probability density remains a Gaussian centered on this oscillating mean,

$$|\psi^{(\alpha)}(x,t)|^2=\sqrt{\frac{m\omega}{\pi\hbar} } e^{-\frac{m\omega}{\hbar}\left(x-  \langle \hat{x}(t) \rangle  \right)^2  }  .$$

== Mathematical features of the canonical coherent states ==
The canonical coherent states described so far have three properties that are mutually equivalent, since each of them completely specifies the state $|\alpha\rangle$, namely,

1. They are eigenvectors of the annihilation operator: $\hat{a}|\alpha\rangle=\alpha|\alpha\rangle \,$.
2. They are obtained from the vacuum by application of a unitary displacement operator: $|\alpha\rangle=e^{\alpha \hat a^\dagger - \alpha^*\hat a}|0\rangle = D(\alpha)|0\rangle\,$.
3. They are states of (balanced) minimal uncertainty: $\Delta X = \Delta P= \sqrt{\frac{\hbar}{2}}\,$.

Each of these properties may lead to generalizations, in general different from each other (see the article "Coherent states in mathematical physics" for some of these). We emphasize that coherent states have mathematical features that are very different from those of a Fock state; for instance, two different coherent states are not orthogonal,

$$\langle\beta|\alpha\rangle=e^{-{1\over2}(|\beta|^2+|\alpha|^2-2\beta^*\alpha)}\neq\delta(\alpha-\beta)$$

(linked to the fact that they are eigenvectors of the non-self-adjoint annihilation operator â).

Thus, if the oscillator is in the quantum state $|\alpha \rangle$ it is also with nonzero probability in the other quantum state $|\beta \rangle$ (but the farther apart the states are situated in phase space, the lower the probability is). However, since they obey a closure relation, any state can be decomposed on the set of coherent states. They hence form an overcomplete basis, in which one can diagonally decompose any state. This is the premise for the Glauber–Sudarshan P representation.

This closure relation can be expressed by the resolution of the identity operator I in the vector space of quantum states,

$$\frac{1}{\pi} \int |\alpha\rangle\langle\alpha| d^2\alpha = I
\qquad d^2\alpha \equiv d\Re(\alpha) \, d\Im(\alpha)  ~.$$

This resolution of the identity is intimately connected to the Segal–Bargmann transform.

Another peculiarity is that $\hat a^\dagger$ has no eigenket (while â has no eigenbra). The following equality is the closest formal substitute, and turns out to be useful for technical computations,

$$a^{\dagger}|\alpha\rangle \langle \alpha |=\left({\partial\over\partial\alpha}+\alpha^*\right)|\alpha\rangle \langle \alpha | ~.$$

This last state is known as an "Agarwal state" or photon-added coherent state and denoted as $|\alpha,1\rangle.$

Normalized Agarwal states of order n can be expressed as $|\alpha,n\rangle=[{\hat{a}^{\dagger}]}^n|\alpha\rangle / \| [{\hat{a}^{\dagger}]}^n|\alpha\rangle \| ~.$

The above resolution of the identity may be derived (restricting to one spatial dimension for simplicity) by taking matrix elements between eigenstates of position, $\langle x | \cdots | y \rangle$, on both sides of the equation. On the right-hand side, this immediately gives δ(x-y). On the left-hand side, the same is obtained by inserting

$$\psi^\alpha(x,t) = \langle x | \alpha(t)\rangle$$

from the previous section (time is arbitrary), then integrating over $\Im (\alpha)$ using the Fourier representation of the delta function, and then performing a Gaussian integral over $\Re (\alpha)$.

In particular, the Gaussian Schrödinger wave-packet state follows from the explicit value

$$\langle x | \alpha\rangle= \frac {1} {\pi^{1/4}}{e^{-\frac{1}{2}{(x-\sqrt{2}\Re(\alpha))^2} +ix \sqrt{2} \Im (\alpha)-i\Re(\alpha)\Im(\alpha)}}                    ~.$$

The resolution of the identity may also be expressed in terms of particle position and momentum. For each coordinate dimension (using an adapted notation with new meaning for $x$),

$$|\alpha\rangle \equiv |x,p\rangle \qquad \qquad
x \equiv \langle \hat{x} \rangle \qquad\qquad  p \equiv \langle \hat{p} \rangle$$

the closure relation of coherent states reads

$$I = \int |x,p\rangle \, \langle x,p| ~ \frac{\mathrm{d}x\,\mathrm{d}p}{2\pi\hbar}   ~.$$

This can be inserted in any quantum-mechanical expectation value, relating it to some quasi-classical phase-space integral and explaining, in particular, the origin of normalisation factors $(2\pi\hbar)^{-1}$ for classical partition functions, consistent with quantum mechanics.

In addition to being an exact eigenstate of annihilation operators, a coherent state is an approximate common eigenstate of particle position and momentum. Restricting to one dimension again,

$$\hat{x} |x,p\rangle \approx x |x,p\rangle \qquad \qquad
\hat{p} |x,p\rangle \approx p |x,p\rangle$$

The error in these approximations is measured by the uncertainties of position and momentum,

$$\langle x, p | \left(\hat{x} - x \right)^2 |x,p\rangle = \left(\Delta x\right)^2
\qquad \qquad
\langle x, p | \left(\hat{p} - p \right)^2 |x,p\rangle = \left(\Delta p\right)^2  ~.$$

== In Bose–Einstein condensates ==
- A Bose–Einstein condensate (BEC) is a collection of boson atoms that are all in the same quantum state. In a thermodynamic system, the ground state becomes macroscopically occupied below a critical temperature — roughly when the thermal de Broglie wavelength is longer than the interatomic spacing. Superfluidity in liquid Helium-4 is believed to be associated with the Bose–Einstein condensation in an ideal gas. But ^{4}He has strong interactions, and the liquid structure factor (a 2nd-order statistic) plays an important role. The use of a coherent state to represent the superfluid component of ^{4}He provided a good estimate of the condensate / non-condensate fractions in superfluidity, consistent with results of slow neutron scattering. Most of the special superfluid properties follow directly from the use of a coherent state to represent the superfluid component — that acts as a macroscopically occupied single-body state with well-defined amplitude and phase over the entire volume. (The superfluid component of ^{4}He goes from zero at the transition temperature to 100% at absolute zero. But the condensate fraction is about 6% at absolute zero temperature, T=0K.)
- Early in the study of superfluidity, Oliver Penrose and Lars Onsager proposed a metric ("order parameter") for superfluidity. It was represented by a macroscopic factored component (a macroscopic eigenvalue) in the first-order reduced density matrix. Later, C. N. Yang proposed a more generalized measure of macroscopic quantum coherence, called off-diagonal long-range order (ODLRO), that included fermion as well as boson systems. ODLRO exists whenever there is a macroscopically large factored component (eigenvalue) in a reduced density matrix of any order. Superfluidity corresponds to a large factored component in the first-order reduced density matrix. (And, all higher order reduced density matrices behave similarly.) Superconductivity involves a large factored component in the 2nd-order ("Cooper electron-pair") reduced density matrix.
- The reduced density matrices used to describe macroscopic quantum coherence in superfluids are formally the same as the correlation functions used to describe orders of coherence in radiation. Both are examples of macroscopic quantum coherence. The macroscopically large coherent component, plus noise, in the electromagnetic field, as given by Glauber's description of signal-plus-noise, is formally the same as the macroscopically large superfluid component plus normal fluid component in the two-fluid model of superfluidity.
- Every-day electromagnetic radiation, such as radio and TV waves, is also an example of near coherent states (macroscopic quantum coherence). That should "give one pause" regarding the conventional demarcation between quantum and classical.
- The coherence in superfluidity should not be attributed to any subset of helium atoms; it is a kind of collective phenomena in which all the atoms are involved (similar to Cooper-pairing in superconductivity, as indicated in the next section).

== In superconductivity ==
- Electrons are fermions, but when they pair up into Cooper pairs they act as bosons, and so can collectively form a coherent state at low temperatures. This pairing is not actually between electrons, but in the states available to the electrons moving in and out of those states. Cooper pairing refers to the first model for superconductivity.
- These coherent states are part of the explanation of effects such as the Quantum Hall effect in low-temperature superconducting semiconductors.

== Angular momentum coherent states ==
- For a quantum system with angular momentum operator $\mathbf{J} = (J_x, J_y, J_z)$ and angular momentum quantum number $j,$ angular momentum coherent states can be defined as those states which minimize the quantity
  $$(\Delta J_x)^2 + (\Delta J_y^2) + (\Delta J_z)^2 ~,$$
  i.e. the sums of the uncertainties of the three Cartesian components of angular momentum. A state $|\psi\rangle$ minimizes this quantity if and only if there exists a unit vector $\mathbf{n}$ such that
  $$(\mathbf{n} \cdot \mathbf{J})|\psi\rangle = \hbar j|\psi\rangle ~.$$

== Generalizations ==
- According to Gilmore and Perelomov, who showed it independently, the construction of coherent states may be seen as a problem in group theory, and thus coherent states may be associated to groups different from the Heisenberg group, which leads to the canonical coherent states discussed above. Moreover, these coherent states may be generalized to quantum groups. These topics, with references to original work, are discussed in detail in Coherent states in mathematical physics.
- In quantum field theory and string theory, a generalization of coherent states to the case where infinitely many degrees of freedom are used to define a vacuum state with a different vacuum expectation value from the original vacuum.
- In one-dimensional many-body quantum systems with fermionic degrees of freedom, low energy excited states can be approximated as coherent states of a bosonic field operator that creates particle-hole excitations. This approach is called bosonization.
- The Gaussian coherent states of nonrelativistic quantum mechanics can be generalized to relativistic coherent states of Klein-Gordon and Dirac particles.
- Coherent states have also appeared in works on loop quantum gravity or for the construction of (semi)classical canonical quantum general relativity.

== See also ==
- Coherent states in mathematical physics
- Quantum field theory
- Quantum optics
- Quantum amplifier
- Electromagnetic field
- Degree of coherence
- Glauber multiple scattering theory
