= Coherent states in mathematical physics =

Role of coherent states

Coherent states have been introduced in a physical context, first as quasi-classical states in quantum mechanics, then as the backbone of quantum optics and they are described in that spirit in the article Coherent states (see also). However, they have generated a huge variety of generalizations, which have led to a tremendous amount of literature in mathematical physics. In this article, we sketch the main directions of research on this line. For further details, we refer to several existing surveys.

== A general definition ==
Let $\mathfrak H\,$ be a complex, separable Hilbert space, $X$ a locally compact space and $d\nu$ a measure on $X$. For each $x$ in $X$, denote $|x\rangle$ a vector in $\mathfrak H$. Assume that this set of vectors possesses the following properties:

1. The mapping $x \mapsto | x \rangle$ is weakly continuous, i.e., for each vector $|\psi\rangle$ in $\mathfrak H$, the function $\Psi (x) = \langle x| \psi\rangle$ is continuous (in the topology of $X$).
2. The resolution of the identity
  $$\int_X | x\rangle\langle x|\, d\nu (x) = I_{\mathfrak H}$$
  holds in the weak sense on the Hilbert space $\mathfrak H$, i.e., for any two vectors $| \phi\rangle , | \psi \rangle$ in $\mathfrak H$, the following equality holds:
  $$\int_X \langle\phi| x\rangle\langle x|\psi\rangle\, d\nu (x) = \langle\phi|\psi\rangle\,.$$

A set of vectors $| x\rangle$ satisfying the two properties above is called a family of generalized coherent states. In order to recover the previous definition of canonical or standard coherent states (CCS), it suffices to take $X\equiv\mathbb{C}$, the complex plane and $d\nu (x) \equiv \frac{1}{\pi} d^2x.$

Sometimes the resolution of the identity condition is replaced by a weaker condition, with the vectors $| x \rangle$ simply forming a total set in ${\mathfrak H}\,$ and the functions $\Psi (x) = \langle x | \psi\rangle$, as $| \psi \rangle$ runs through ${\mathfrak H}$, forming a reproducing kernel Hilbert space. The objective in both cases is to ensure that an arbitrary vector $| \psi \rangle$ be expressible as a linear (integral) combination of these vectors. Indeed, the resolution of the identity immediately implies that
$$| \psi \rangle = \int_X \Psi (x) \left| x \right\rangle\, d\nu (x)\, ,$$
where $\Psi (x) = \langle x | \psi\rangle$.

These vectors $\Psi$ are square integrable, continuous functions on $X$ and satisfy the reproducing property
$$\int_X K (x,y )\Psi (y)\, d\nu (y) = \Psi (x)\, ,$$
where $K (x, y) = \langle x | y \rangle$ is the reproducing kernel, which satisfies the following properties

$$\begin{align}
K (x, y) &= \overline{K (y, x)}\; , \qquad K (x, x) > 0\, , \\
\int_X K(x,z)\, K(z, y) \, d\nu (z) &= K(x,y)\, .
\end{align}$$

== Some examples ==
We present in this section some of the more commonly used types of coherent states, as illustrations of the general structure given above.

=== Nonlinear coherent states ===
A large class of generalizations of the CCS is obtained by a simple modification of their analytic structure. Let $\varepsilon_1 \leq \varepsilon_2 \leq \dots \leq \varepsilon_n \leq \cdots$ be an infinite sequence of positive numbers ($\varepsilon_1 \neq 0$). Define $\varepsilon_n ! = \varepsilon_1 \varepsilon_2 \ldots \varepsilon_n$ and by convention set $\varepsilon_0 ! = 1$. In the same Fock space in which the CCS were described, we now define the related deformed or nonlinear coherent states by the expansion

$$\vert \alpha\rangle = {\mathcal N}(\vert \alpha\vert^2)^{-1/2} \, \sum_{n=0}^\infty \frac {\alpha^n}{\sqrt{\varepsilon_n !}}| n\rangle\, .$$
The normalization factor ${\mathcal N}(\vert \alpha\vert^2)$ is chosen so that $\langle \alpha \vert \alpha \rangle = 1$. These generalized coherent states are overcomplete in the Fock space and satisfy a resolution of the identity
$$\int_{\mathcal D}
\vert \alpha \rangle\langle \alpha \vert\; {\mathcal N}(\vert \alpha\vert^2)\;
d\nu (\alpha, \overline{\alpha} ) = I\, ,$$

$\mathcal D$ being an open disc in the complex plane of radius $L$, the radius of convergence of the series $\sum_{n=0}^\infty \frac {\alpha^n}{\sqrt{\varepsilon_n !}}$ (in the case of the CCS, $L= \infty$.) The measure $d\nu$ is generically of the form $d\theta\,d\lambda (r)$ (for $\alpha = re^{i\theta}$), where $d\lambda$ is related to the $\varepsilon_n !$ through the moment condition.

Once again, we see that for an arbitrary vector $| \phi\rangle$ in the Fock space, the function $\Phi(\alpha) = \langle \phi | \alpha\rangle$ is of the form $\Phi(\alpha) = {\mathcal N}(\vert \alpha\vert^2)^{-\frac 12}f(\alpha)$, where $f\,$ is an analytic function on the domain $\mathcal D$. The reproducing kernel associated to these coherent states is
$$K(\overline{\alpha}, \alpha' ) = \langle \alpha| \alpha'\rangle =
\left[{\mathcal N}(\vert \alpha\vert^2) {\mathcal N}(\vert \alpha'\vert^2)\right]^{-\frac 12}
\sum_{n=0}^\infty \frac {(\overline{\alpha} \alpha')^n}{\varepsilon_n!}\, .$$

=== Barut–Girardello coherent states ===
By analogy with the CCS case, one can define a generalized annihilation operator $A$ by its action on the vectors $| \alpha\rangle$,
$$A| \alpha \rangle = \alpha| \alpha \rangle\, ,$$
and its adjoint operator $A^\dagger$. These act on the Fock states $| n\rangle$ as
$$A | n\rangle = \sqrt{\varepsilon_n}| n -1 \rangle\, , \qquad A^\dagger| n \rangle = \sqrt{\varepsilon_{n+1}}| n+1 \rangle\, .$$
Depending on the exact values of the quantities $\varepsilon_n$, these two operators, together with the identity $I$ and all their commutators, could generate a wide range of algebras including various types of deformed quantum algebras. The term 'nonlinear', as often applied to these generalized coherent states, comes again from quantum optics where many such families of states are used in studying the interaction between the radiation field and atoms, where the strength of the interaction itself depends on the frequency of radiation. Of course, these coherent states will not in general have either the group theoretical or the minimal uncertainty properties of the CCS (they might have more general ones).

Operators $A$ and $A^\dagger$ of the general type defined above are also known as ladder operators . When such operators appear as generators of representations of Lie algebras, the eigenvectors of $A$ are usually called Barut–Girardello coherent states. A typical example is obtained from the representations of the Lie algebra of SU(1,1) on the Fock space.

=== Gazeau–Klauder coherent states ===
A non-analytic extension of the above expression of the non-linear coherent states is often used to define generalized coherent states associated to physical Hamiltonians having pure point spectra. These coherent states, known as Gazeau–Klauder coherent states, are labelled by action-angle variables. Suppose that we are given the physical Hamiltonian $H = \sum_{n=0}^\infty E_n \left| n \right\rangle \left\langle n\right|$, with $E_0 = 0$, i.e., it has the energy eigenvalues $E_n$ and eigenvectors $| n\rangle$, which we assume to form an orthonormal basis for the Hilbert space of states ${\mathfrak H}$. Let us write the eigenvalues as $E_n = \omega\varepsilon_n$ by introducing a sequence of dimensionless quantities $\{\varepsilon_n\}$ ordered as: $0 = \varepsilon_0 < \varepsilon_1 < \varepsilon_2 < \cdots$. Then, for all $J \geq 0$ and $\gamma \in \mathbb R$, the Gazeau–Klauder coherent states are defined as

$$|J ,\gamma\rangle =\mathcal N(J)^{-\frac 12}\sum_{n=0}^\infty\,\frac{J^{n/2}
e^{-i\varepsilon_n \gamma}}{\sqrt{\varepsilon_n !}}|n\rangle\, ,$$
where again $\mathcal N$ is a normalization factor, which turns out to be dependent on $J$ only. These coherent states satisfy the temporal stability condition,

$$e^{-iHt}\vert J, \gamma \rangle = \vert J, \gamma + \omega t \rangle\, ,$$
and the action identity,
$$\langle J, \gamma | H| J, \gamma \rangle_{\mathfrak H} = \omega J\, .$$
While these generalized coherent states do form an overcomplete set in ${\mathfrak H}$, the resolution of the identity is generally not given by an integral relation as above, but instead by an integral in Bohr's sense, like it is in use in the theory of almost periodic functions.

Actually the construction of Gazeau–Klauder CS can be extended to vector CS and to Hamiltonians with degenerate spectra, as shown by Ali and Bagarello.

=== Heat kernel coherent states ===
Another type of coherent state arises when considering a particle whose configuration space is the group manifold of a compact Lie group K. Hall introduced coherent states in which the usual Gaussian on Euclidean space is replaced by the heat kernel on K. The parameter space for the coherent states is the "complexification" of K; e.g., if K is SU(n) then the complexification is SL(n,C). These coherent states have a resolution of the identity that leads to a Segal-Bargmann space over the complexification. Hall's results were extended to compact symmetric spaces, including spheres, by Stenzel. The heat kernel coherent states, in the case $K=\mathrm{SU}(2)$, have been applied in the theory of quantum gravity by Thiemann and his collaborators. Although there are two different Lie groups involved in the construction, the heat kernel coherent states are not of Perelomov type.

== The group-theoretical approach ==
Gilmore and Perelomov, independently, realized that the construction of coherent states may sometimes be viewed as a group theoretical problem.

In order to see this, let us go back for a while to the case of CCS. There, indeed, the displacement operator $D(\alpha)$ is nothing but the representative in Fock space of an element of the Heisenberg group (also called the Weyl–Heisenberg group), whose Lie algebra is generated by $X,\, P$ and $I$. However, before going on with the CCS, take first the general case.

Let $G$ be a locally compact group and suppose that it has a continuous, irreducible representation $U$ on a Hilbert space $\mathfrak H$ by unitary operators $U(g), \; g \in G$. This representation is called square integrable if there exists a non-zero vector $| \psi \rangle$ in $\mathfrak H$ for which the integral
$$c(\psi) = \int_G \vert\langle\psi | U(g)\psi\rangle\vert^2\, d\mu (g)$$
converges. Here $d\mu$ is the left invariant Haar measure on $G$. A vector $| \psi\rangle$ for which $c(\psi) < \infty$ is said to be admissible, and it can be shown that the existence of one such vector guarantees the existence of an entire dense set of such vectors in $\mathfrak H$. Moreover, if the group $G$ is unimodular, i.e., if the left and the right invariant measures coincide, then the existence of one admissible vector implies that every vector in $\mathfrak H$ is admissible. Given a square integrable representation $U$ and an admissible vector $|\psi\rangle$, let us define the vectors

$$| g\rangle = \frac 1{\sqrt{c(\psi )}}\, U(g)| \psi \rangle , \text{ for all } g\in G.$$
These vectors are the analogues of the canonical coherent states, written there in terms of the representation of the Heisenberg group (however, see the section on Gilmore-Perelomov CS, below). Next, it can be shown that the resolution of the identity
$$\int_G \left| g \right\rangle \left\langle g\right| \, d\mu (g) = I_{\mathfrak H}$$
holds on ${\mathfrak H}$. Thus, the vectors $| g\rangle$ constitute a family of generalized coherent states. The functions $F(g) = \langle g| \phi\rangle$ for all vectors $| \phi \rangle$ in $\mathfrak H$ are square integrable with respect to the measure $d\mu$ and the set of such functions, which in fact are continuous in the topology of $G$, forms a closed subspace of $L^2 (G, d\mu )$. Furthermore, the mapping $\phi \mapsto F$ is a linear isometry between $\mathfrak H$ and $L^2 (G, d\mu )$ and under this isometry the representation $U$ gets mapped to a subrepresentation of the left regular representation of $G$ on $L^2 (G, d\mu)$.

=== An example: wavelets ===
A typical example of the above construction is provided by the affine group of the line, $G_{\text{Aff}}$. This is the group of all 2×2 matrices of the type,
$$g = \begin{pmatrix} a & b \\ 0 & 1 \end{pmatrix}\, ,$$
$a$ and $b$ being real numbers with $a \neq 0$. We shall also write $g = (b,a)$, with the action on $\mathbb{R}$ given by $(b,a) \cdot x = b+ax$. This group is non-unimodular, with the left invariant measure being given by $d\mu (b,a ) = a^{-2} \, db \, da$ (the right invariant measure being $a^{-1} \, db \, da$). The affine group has a unitary irreducible representation on the Hilbert space $L^2 (\mathbb R, dx )$. Vectors in $L^2 (\mathbb R, dx )$ are measurable functions $\varphi(x)$ of the real variable $x$ and the (unitary) operators $U(b,a)$ of this representation act on them as
$$(U(b,a)\varphi )(x) = \frac 1{\sqrt{\vert a\vert}}\,\varphi \left(\frac {x-b}a\right)
= \frac 1{\sqrt{\vert a\vert}}\,\varphi \left((b,a)^{-1}\cdot x\right)\, .$$
If $\psi$ is a function in $L^2 (\mathbb R, dx )$ such that its Fourier transform $\widehat\psi$ satisfies the (admissibility) condition
$$\int_{\mathbb R} \frac {\vert\widehat\psi (k)\vert^2}{\vert k \vert}\, dk < \infty\, ,$$
then it can be shown to be an admissible vector, i.e.,
$$c(\psi ) = \int_{G_\text{Aff}} \left\vert \left\langle \psi | U(b,a)\psi \right\rangle \right\vert^2 \, \frac {db\,da}{a^2} < \infty\, .$$
Thus, following the general construction outlined above, the vectors
$$| b, a\rangle = \frac 1 {\sqrt{c(\psi)}} \, U(b,a)\psi\, , \qquad (b,a) \in G_{\text{Aff}}$$
define a family of generalized coherent states and one has the resolution of the identity
$$\int_{G_\text{Aff}} \left| b, a\right\rangle \left\langle b,a\right| \frac {db\,da}{a^2} = I$$
on $L^2 (\mathbb R, dx )$. In the signal analysis literature, a vector satisfying the admissibility condition above is called a mother wavelet and the generalized coherent states $| b, a\rangle$ are called wavelets. Signals are then identified with vectors $| \varphi \rangle$ in $L^2 (\mathbb R, dx )$ and the function
$$F(b,a) = \langle b,a| \varphi\rangle\, ,$$
is called the continuous wavelet transform of the signal $\varphi$.

This concept can be extended to two dimensions, the group $G_{\text{Aff}}$ being replaced by the so-called similitude group of the plane, which consists of plane translations, rotations and global dilations. The resulting 2D wavelets, and some generalizations of them, are widely used in image processing.

=== Gilmore–Perelomov coherent states ===
The construction of coherent states using group representations described above is not sufficient. Already it cannot yield the CCS, since these are not indexed by the elements of the Heisenberg group, but rather by points of the quotient of the latter by its center, that quotient being precisely $\mathbb R^2$. The key observation is that the center of the Heisenberg group leaves the vacuum vector $|0\rangle$ invariant, up to a phase. Generalizing this idea, Gilmore and Perelomov consider a locally compact group $G$ and a unitary irreducible representation $U$ of $G$ on the Hilbert space $\mathfrak H$, not necessarily square integrable. Fix a vector $|\psi\rangle$ in ${\mathfrak H}$, of unit norm, and denote by $H$ the subgroup of $G$ consisting of all elements $h$ that leave it invariant up to a phase, that is,
$$U(h) \left| \psi \right|\rangle = e^{i\omega (h)} \left|\psi\right\rangle\, ,$$
where $\omega$ is a real-valued function of $h$. Let $X = G/H$ be the left coset space and $x$ an arbitrary element in $X$. Choosing a coset representative $g(x) \in G$, for each coset $x$, we define the vectors
$$| x\rangle = U(g(x)) \left|\psi\right\rangle \in {\mathfrak H}.$$
The dependence of these vectors on the specific choice of the coset representative $g(x)$ is only through a phase. Indeed, if instead of $g(x)$, we took a different representative $g(x)' \in G$ for the same coset $x$, then since $g(x)' = g(x)h$ for some $h \in H$, we would have $U(g(x)')| \psi\rangle = e^{i\omega (h)}| x\rangle$. Hence, quantum mechanically, both $| x\rangle$ and $U(g(x)') | \psi\rangle$ represent the same physical state and in particular, the projection operator $\left| x\right\rangle \left\langle x \right|$ depends only on the coset. Vectors $| x\rangle$ defined in this way are called Gilmore–Perelomov coherent states. Since $U$ is assumed to be irreducible, the set of all these vectors as $x$ runs through $G/H$ is dense in $\mathfrak H$. In this definition of generalized coherent states, no resolution of the identity is postulated. However, if $X$ carries an invariant measure, under the natural action of $G$, and if the formal operator $B$ defined as
$$B = \int_X \left| x\right\rangle \left\langle x\right| d\mu (x)\, ,$$
is bounded, then it is necessarily a multiple of the identity and a resolution of the identity is again retrieved.

Gilmore–Perelomov coherent states have been generalized to quantum groups, but for this we refer to the literature.

== Further generalization: Coherent states on coset spaces ==
The Perelomov construction can be used to define coherent states for any locally compact group. On the other hand, particularly in case of failure of the Gilmore–Perelomov construction, there exist other constructions of generalized coherent states, using group representations, which generalize the notion of square integrability to homogeneous spaces of the group.

Briefly, in this approach one starts with a unitary irreducible representation $U$ and attempts to find a vector $| \psi\rangle$, a subgroup $H$ and a section $\sigma : G/H \to G$ such that
$$\int_{G/H} \left| x\right\rangle \left\langle x\right| d\mu (x) = T\, ,$$
where $| x\rangle = U(\sigma (x)) \left| \psi \right\rangle$, $T$ is a bounded, positive operator with bounded inverse and $d\mu$ is a quasi-invariant measure on $X = G/H$. It is not assumed that $|\psi\rangle$ be invariant up to a phase under the action of $H$ and clearly, the best situation is when $T$ is a multiple of the identity. Although somewhat technical, this general construction is of enormous versatility for semi-direct product groups of the type $\mathbb R^n \rtimes K$, where $K$ is a closed subgroup of $GL(n, \mathbb R )$. Thus, it is useful for many physically important groups, such as the Poincaré group or the Euclidean group, which do not have square integrable representations in the sense of the earlier definition. In particular, the integral condition defining the operator $T$ ensures that any vector $| \phi \rangle$ in $\mathfrak H$ can be written in terms of the generalized coherent states $| x\rangle$ namely,
$$| \phi \rangle = \int_X \Psi (x) | x\rangle \, d\mu (x)\, , \qquad
\Psi (x) = \langle x | T^{-1}\phi \rangle \, ,$$
which is the primary aim of any kind of coherent states.

== Coherent states: a Bayesian construction for the quantization of a measure set ==
We now depart from the standard situation and present a general method of construction of coherent states, starting from a few observations on the structure of these objects as superpositions of eigenstates of some self-adjoint operator, as was the harmonic oscillator Hamiltonian for the standard CS. It is the essence of quantum mechanics that this superposition has a probabilistic flavor. As a matter of fact, we notice that the probabilistic structure of the canonical coherent states involves two probability distributions that underlie their construction. There are, in a sort of duality, a Poisson distribution ruling the probability of detecting $n$ excitations when the quantum system is in a coherent state $|z\rangle$, and a gamma distribution on the set $\mathbb C$ of complex parameters, more exactly on the range $\mathbb R^{+}$ of the square of the radial variable. The generalization follows that duality scheme. Let $X$ be a set of parameters equipped with a measure $\mu$ and its associated Hilbert space $L^2(X, d\mu)$ of complex-valued functions, square integrable with respect to $\mu$. Let us choose in $L^2(X, d\mu)$ a finite or countable orthonormal set $\mathcal{O}=\{\phi_n\, , \, n = 0, 1, \dots \}$:
$$\langle \phi_m | \phi_n \rangle = \int_{X}\overline{\phi_m(x)}\, \phi_n(x)\, d\mu(x) = \delta_{mn}\, .$$
In case of infinite countability, this set must obey the (crucial) finiteness condition:
$$0 < \mathcal{N}(x) := \sum_n \vert \phi_n (x)\vert^2 < \infty \, \quad \mathrm{a.e.}\, .$$
Let $\mathfrak{H}$ be a separable complex Hilbert space with orthonormal basis $\{|e_n\rangle\, , \, n = 0, 1, \dots \}$ in one-to-one correspondence with the elements of $\mathcal{O}$. The two conditions above imply that the family of normalized coherent states $\mathcal{F}_{\mathfrak{H}}= \{|x\rangle\, , \, x \in X \}$ in $\mathfrak{H}$, which are defined by
$$|x\rangle = \frac{1}{\sqrt{\mathcal{N}(x)}}\sum_n \overline{\phi_n(x)}\, |e_n\rangle\, ,$$
resolves the identity in $\mathfrak{H}$:
$$\int_X d\mu(x) \,\mathcal{N}(x) \left|x\right\rangle \left\langle x \right| = I_{\mathfrak{H}}\, .$$
Such a relation allows us to implement a coherent state or frame quantization of the set of parameters $X$ by associating to a function $X \ni x \mapsto f(x)$ that satisfies appropriate conditions the following operator in $\mathfrak{H}$:
$$f(x) \mapsto A_f := \int_X \mu(dx) \,\mathcal{N}(x) \, f(x) \left|x\right\rangle \left\langle x \right| .$$
The operator $A_f$ is symmetric if $f(x)$ is real-valued, and it is self-adjoint (as a quadratic form) if $f(x)$ is real and semi-bounded. The original $f(x)$ is an upper symbol, usually non-unique, for the operator $A_f$. It will be called a classical observable with respect to the family $\mathcal{F}_{\mathfrak{H}}$ if the so-called lower symbol of $A_f$, defined as
$$\check{f} (x) := \langle x | A_f | x \rangle = \int_X\mu(dx') \,\mathcal{N}(x') \, f(x')\, \vert\langle x| x'\rangle\vert^2 \, .$$
has mild functional properties to be made precise according to further topological properties granted to the original set $X$. A last point of this construction of the space of quantum states concerns its statistical aspects. There is indeed an interplay between two probability distributions:

1. For almost each $x$, a discrete distribution,
  $$n \mapsto \frac{\vert \phi_n (x) \vert^2}{{\mathcal N} (x)}.$$
  This probability could be considered as concerning experiments performed on the system within some experimental protocol, in order to measure the spectral values of a certain self-adjoint operator $A$, i.e., a quantum observable, acting in $\mathfrak{H}$ and having the discrete spectral resolution $A = \sum_n a_n \left|e_n\right\rangle \left\langle e_n\right|$.
2. For each $n$, a continuous distribution on $(X,\mu)$,
  $$X \ni x \mapsto \vert \phi_n (x) \vert^2\,.$$
  Here, we observe a Bayesian duality typical of coherent states. There are two interpretations: the resolution of the unity verified by the coherent states $|x\rangle$ introduces a preferred prior measure on the set $X$, which is the set of parameters of the discrete distribution, with this distribution itself playing the role of the likelihood function. The associated discretely indexed continuous distributions become the related conditional posterior distribution. Hence, a probabilistic approach to experimental observations concerning $A$ should serve as a guideline in choosing the set of the $\phi_n(x)$'s. We note that the continuous prior distribution will be relevant for the quantization whereas the discrete posterior one characterizes the measurement of the physical spectrum from which is built the coherent superposition of quantum states $|e_n\rangle$.

== See also ==
- Coherent states
- Lieb conjecture
- Quantization
