= Malvin Carl Teich =

Physicist

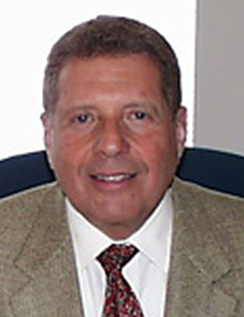
- Teich in 1998
- Born: 4 May 1939; NYC, New York State, U.S.
- Education: M.I.T. Stanford University; Cornell University
- Known for: Quantum photonics, Computational neuroscience, Fractal stochastic processes
- Awards: Browder Thompson Prize (1969); Guggenheim Fellowship (1973); AAAS Fellow (1989); Palacký University Medal (1992); Morris E. Leeds Award (1997); IEEE Life Fellow (2005); BU Distinguished Scholar (2009)
- Scientific career
- Fields: Electrical engineering Applied physics Photonics; Neuroscience
- Workplaces: M.I.T. Lincoln Laboratory; Columbia University; Boston University
- Thesis: Two Quantum Photoemission and dc Photomixing in Sodium (February 1966)
- Doctoral advisor: George J. Wolga
- Website: https://people.bu.edu/teich/

Malvin Carl Teich is an American electrical engineer, physicist, and computational neuroscientist which is professor emeritus of electrical engineering at Columbia University and physics at Boston University. He is also a consultant to government, academia, and private industry, where he serves as an advisor in intellectual-property conflicts. He is the coauthor of Fundamentals of Photonics (Wiley, 3rd Ed. 2019, with B. E. A. Saleh), and of Fractal-Based Point Processes (Wiley, 2005, with S. B. Lowen).

== Education ==
Teich's academic credentials include an S.B. degree in physics from the Massachusetts Institute of Technology, an M.S. degree in electrical engineering from Stanford University, and a Ph.D. degree from Cornell University. His bachelor's thesis, written jointly with Paul J. Schweitzer and supervised by Theos J. Thompson, investigated the total neutron cross section of palladium using the fast chopper at the M.I.T. nuclear reactor. In carrying out his Ph.D. dissertation, supervised by George J. Wolga, he made use of the then-new gallium-arsenide laser diode to observe the nonlinear two-photon photoelectric effect in metallic sodium. The principal results that followed from his doctoral dissertation were published in Physical Review Letters.

== Career ==
Teich assumed his first professional affiliation in January 1966 at M.I.T. Lincoln Laboratory, as a member of the research group directed by Robert J. Keyes and Robert H. Kingston. In September 1967, he joined the faculty of Columbia University, where he served as a member of the Electrical Engineering Department (as Chairman from 1978 to 1980), the Applied Physics and Applied Mathematics Department, the Columbia Radiation Laboratory (founded and directed by I. I. Rabi) in the Department of Physics, and the Fowler Memorial Laboratory (directed by Shyam M. Khanna) in the Department of Otolaryngology at the Columbia University Medical Center. In 1996, he was appointed Professor Emeritus of Engineering Science and Applied Physics. In 1995, concurrently with his Emeritus status at Columbia, he joined Boston University as a faculty member in the Department of Electrical & Computer Engineering (as Director of the Quantum Photonics Laboratory and as a member of the Boston University Photonics Center), the Department of Biomedical Engineering (as a member of the Graduate Program for Neuroscience and the Hearing Research Center), and the Department of Physics. In 2011, he was appointed Professor Emeritus of Electrical & Computer Engineering, Biomedical Engineering, and Physics in Boston University. Over the course of his career, his efforts in quantum photonics have been devoted to exploring the properties, behavior, and applications of classical and nonclassical light, including its generation, characterization, modulation, transmission, propagation, amplification, detection, and frequency-conversion. In computational neuroscience, he has concentrated on elucidating the role of fractal stochastic processes in neural information transmission. He has also worked on codifying the detection laws of audition and vision, an enterprise that lies at the interface of quantum photonics and computational neuroscience.

== Research contributions ==
=== M.I.T. Lincoln Laboratory ===
Quantum Photonics: Infrared heterodyne detection.

=== Columbia University ===
Quantum Photonics: Optical heterodyne detection. Photon statistics and point processes. Single-photon detection at the retinal rod. Squeezed Franck–Hertz experiment. Behavior of nonclassical light at a beam splitter. Noise in avalanche photodiodes (APDs). Noise in fiber-optic amplifiers.
Computational Neuroscience: Noise in neural-network amplifiers. Hensen's-cell vibrations in the cochlea. Fractal character of the cochlear-nerve-fiber spike train. Fractal shot noise.

=== Boston University ===
Quantum Photonics: Entangled-photon properties. Entangled-photon interference. Entangled-photon dispersion cancellation. Entangled-photon photoelectric effect. Entangled-photon absorption and transparency. Entangled-photon spectroscopy. Entangled n-photon absorption and spectroscopy. Hyperentangled quantum states. Entangled-photon holography. Entangled-photon and ghost imaging. Entangled-photon microscopy. Quantum optical coherence tomography (QOCT). Entangled-photon ellipsometry. Entangled-photon cryptography. Entangled-photon generation. Ultrafast entangled-photon generation. Quantum information. Ubiquity of the inverse-square photon-count power spectral density at baseband.
Computational Neuroscience: Fractal character of the optic-nerve-fiber spike train. Fractal behavior of neurotransmitter exocytosis. Heart rate variability (HRV). Detection theory in hearing and vision.

== Awards and honors ==
- Sigma Xi (1968).
- IEEE Browder J. Thompson Memorial Prize Award for the paper "Infrared Heterodyne Detection," published in Proceedings of the IEEE (1969). Presented from 1945 through 1997, this award recognized the best paper in any IEEE publication by an author under thirty years of age.
- John Simon Guggenheim Memorial Fellowship (1973).
- Fellow of Optica (1983). Optica was formerly known as The Optical Society, and prior to that as the Optical Society of America (OSA).
- Fellow of the American Physical Society (APS) (1988).
- Fellow of the American Association for the Advancement of Science (AAAS) (1989).
- Fellow of the Institute of Electrical and Electronics Engineers (IEEE) (1989).
- Tau Beta Pi (1989).
- Commemorative Medal of Palacký University, Olomouc, Czech Republic (1992).
- Fellow of the Acoustical Society of America (ASA) (1994).
- IEEE Morris E. Leeds Award (1997). Presented from 1958 through 2000, this award honored outstanding contributions to the field of electrical measurement.
- Life Fellow of the Institute of Electrical and Electronics Engineers (IEEE) (2005).
- Distinguished Scholar Award of Boston University (2009).
- Fellow of SPIE–The International Society for Optics and Photonics (2011).

== See also ==
- List of textbooks in electromagnetism
