= NOON state =

Quantum-mechanical many-body entangled state

In quantum optics, a NOON state or N00N state is a quantum-mechanical many-body entangled state:

$$|\text{NOON} \rangle = \frac{|N \rangle_a |0\rangle_b + e^{iN \theta} |{0}\rangle_a |{N}\rangle_b}{\sqrt{2}}, \,$$

which represents a superposition of N particles in mode a with zero particles in mode b, and vice versa. Usually, the particles are photons, but in principle any bosonic field can support NOON states.

== Applications ==
NOON states are an important concept in quantum metrology and quantum sensing for their ability to make precision phase measurements when used in an optical interferometer. For example, consider the observable

$$A = |N,0\rangle\langle 0,N| + |0,N\rangle\langle N,0|. \,$$

The expectation value of $A$ for a system in a NOON state switches between +1 and −1 when $\theta$ changes from 0 to $\pi/N$. Moreover, the error in the phase measurement becomes

$$\Delta \theta = \frac{\Delta A}{|d\langle A\rangle / d\theta|} = \frac{1}{N}.$$

This is the so-called Heisenberg limit, and gives a quadratic improvement over the standard quantum limit. NOON states are closely related to Schrödinger cat states and GHZ states, and are extremely fragile.

== Towards experimental realization ==
There have been several theoretical proposals for creating photonic NOON states. Pieter Kok, Hwang Lee, and Jonathan Dowling proposed the first general method based on post-selection via photodetection. The down-side of this method was its exponential scaling of the success probability of the protocol. Pryde and White subsequently introduced a simplified method using intensity-symmetric multiport beam splitters, single photon inputs, and either heralded or conditional measurement. Their method, for example, allows heralded production of the N = 4 NOON state without the need for postselection or zero photon detections, and has the same success probability of 3/64 as the more complicated circuit of Kok et al. Cable and Dowling proposed a method that has polynomial scaling in the success probability, which can therefore be called efficient.

Two-photon NOON states, where N = 2, can be created deterministically from two identical photons and a 50:50 beam splitter. This is called the Hong–Ou–Mandel effect in quantum optics. Three- and four-photon NOON states cannot be created deterministically from single-photon states, but they have been created probabilistically via post-selection using spontaneous parametric down-conversion. A different approach, involving the interference of non-classical light created by spontaneous parametric down-conversion and a classical laser beam on a 50:50 beam splitter, was used by I. Afek, O. Ambar, and Y. Silberberg to experimentally demonstrate the production of NOON states up to N = 5.

Super-resolution has previously been used as indicator of NOON state production, in 2005 Resch et al. showed that it could equally well be prepared by classical interferometry. They showed that only phase super-sensitivity is an unambiguous indicator of a NOON state; furthermore they introduced criteria for determining if it has been achieved based on the observed visibility and efficiency. Phase super sensitivity of NOON states with N = 2 was demonstrated and super resolution, but not super sensitivity as the efficiency was too low, of NOON states up to N = 4 photons was also demonstrated experimentally.

== History and terminology ==
NOON states were first introduced by Barry C. Sanders in the context of studying quantum decoherence in cat states. They were independently rediscovered in 2000 by Jonathan P. Dowling's group at JPL, who introduced them as the basis for the concept of quantum lithography. The term "NOON state" first appeared in print as a footnote in a paper published by Hwang Lee, Pieter Kok, and Jonathan Dowling on quantum metrology, where it was spelled N00N, with zeros instead of Os.
