= Jeffrey Shapiro =

American physicist

Jeffrey H. Shapiro
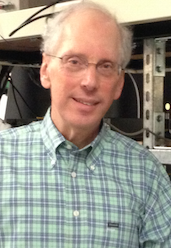
- Education: Massachusetts Institute of Technology
- Known for: Quantum communication, squeezed state, ghost imaging
- Scientific career
- Fields: Electrical engineering
- Workplaces: Massachusetts Institute of Technology, Case Western Reserve University
- Doctoral advisor: Robert S. Kennedy

Jeffrey H. Shapiro is a Julius A. Stratton Professor of electrical engineering and computer science at the Massachusetts Institute of Technology and the former director of the Research Laboratory of Electronics. He made seminal contributions to understanding the fundamental quantum limits on communications, generation, detection, and application of quantum squeezed state, ghost imaging, and quantum information science. He invented the microchannel-plate spatial light modulator with Cardinal Warde.

== Biography ==
Shapiro received his S.B., S.M., E.E., and Ph.D. degrees in electrical engineering from MIT in 1967, 1968, 1969, and 1970, respectively. From 1970 to 1973, he was on the faculty of Case Western Reserve University. From 1973 to 1985, he was an associate professor of electrical engineering at MIT, and in 1985, he was promoted to professor of electrical engineering. He became a Julius A. Stratton Professor in 1999.

From 1989 to 1999, Shapiro served as the associate department head of MIT's department of electrical engineering and computer science. He was appointed director of the Research Laboratory of Electronics in 2001. He is also a director of MIT's Optical and Quantum Communications Group.

== Research ==
Shapiro's research focuses on utilizing quantum mechanical effects to develop metrology tools and applications, whose performance greatly exceeds what can be realized with conventional, classical-physics systems. In particular, his group investigated the quantum limits on optical communications, such as remote viewing, and derived the capacity of quantum channels. His group also demonstrated high-performance entanglement sources and took advantage of these sources to implement quantum key distribution systems. Shapiro's group pioneered in developing quantum illumination, which enables use of entanglement in lossy and noisy environments.

== Honors ==
- Fellow of the Institute of Electrical and Electronics Engineers (IEEE)
- Fellow of the Optical Society of America (OSA)
- Fellow of the American Physical Society (APS)
- Fellow of the Institute of Physics (IoP)
- Fellow of SPIE
- 2008 International Quantum Communication Award
- 2008 IEEE/LEOS Quantum Electronics Award
