= Jonathan Dowling =

Irish-American physicist (1955–2020)

Jonathan P. Dowling
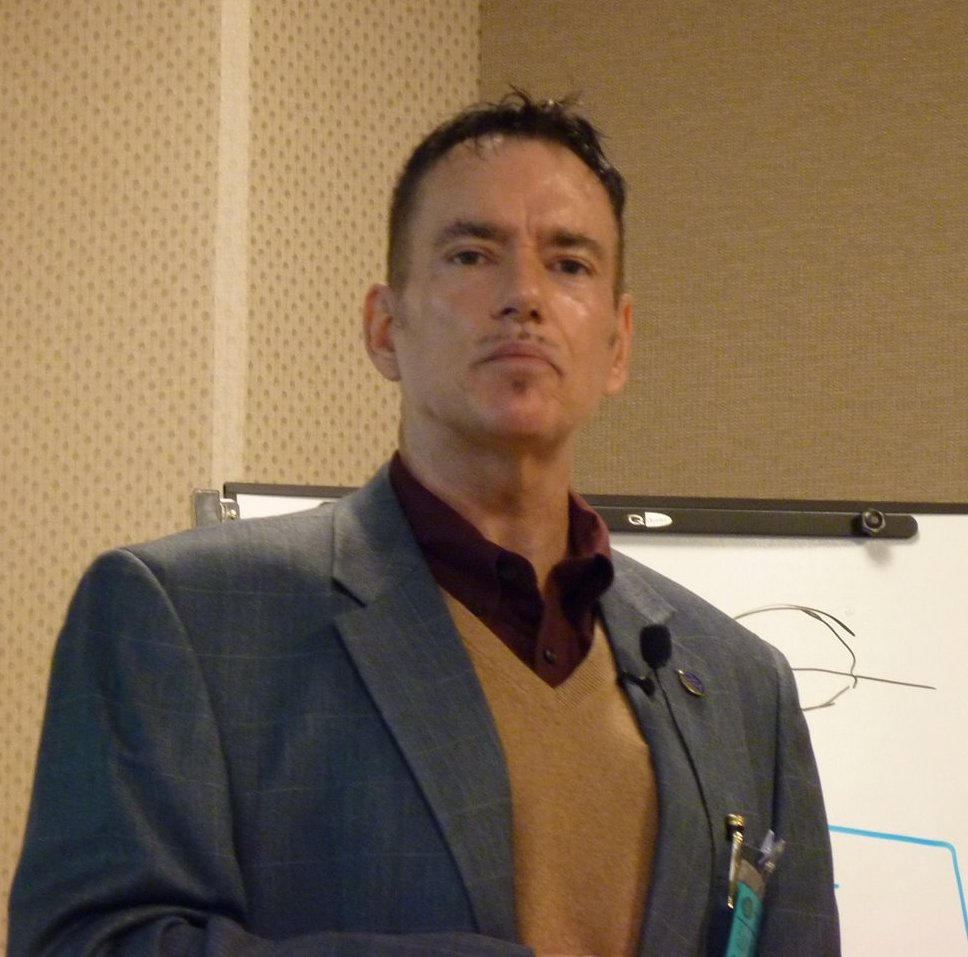
- Dowling in 2010
- Born: 3 April 1955; Smithtown, New York
- Died: 5 June 2020 (aged 65)
- Education: University of Colorado at Boulder
- Known for: Quantum Optics, Quantum technology
- Awards: Willis Lamb Medal
- Scientific career
- Fields: Physicist
- Workplaces: Louisiana State University
- Doctoral advisor: Asim Orhan Barut

Jonathan P. Dowling (3 April 1955 – 5 June 2020) was an Irish-American researcher and professor in theoretical physics, known for his work on quantum technology, particularly for exploiting quantum entanglement (in the form of a NOON state) for applications to quantum metrology, quantum sensing, and quantum imaging.

== Career ==
Dowling obtained a PhD in 1988 from the University of Colorado-Boulder. He worked at the Max Planck Institute of Quantum Optics, the United States Army Aviation and Missile Command, the NASA Jet Propulsion Laboratory, and the Louisiana State University.

Dowling was one of the founders of the US Government program in quantum computing and quantum cryptography.

Dowling was the co-director of the Horace Hearne Institute for Theoretical Physics and a Hearne chair in theoretical physics at the department of physics and astronomy, both at Louisiana State University.

== Research ==
Dowling authored scientific publications in quantum electrodynamics, quantum optics, and quantum technology. At the time of his death, his publications had been cited over 20,200 times, with a Hirsch index of 64.

Dowling published papers are on the topics of Linear optical quantum computing, quantum lithography, optical switching in photonic crystals, and the photonic band-edge laser. Dowling also researched the quantum theory of atomic spontaneous emission and other quantum electrodynamics effects in optical micro-cavities and photonic crystals, as well as optical quantum computing, quantum metrology, quantum imaging, and quantum sensing.

== Awards and recognition ==
- Fellow, American Association for the Advancement of Science
- Fellow, American Physical Society
- Fellow, The Optical Society
- Willis Lamb Award for Laser Science and Quantum Optics, 2002
- LSU Foundation Distinguished Faculty Teaching Award, 2012
- Undergraduate Physics & Astronomy Majors Teaching Award, 2013
- Department of Physics and Astronomy Graduate Faculty Teaching Award in 2017

== Publications ==
Dowling is the author of a popular science book, "Schrödinger's Killer App – Race to Build the World's First Quantum Computer". A story in this book about early motivations for funding quantum computing by the United States military was illustrated by Saturday Morning Breakfast Cereal following his death. Additionally, this book formulated what is known as the Dowling-Neven Law, regarding the classical cost of simulating quantum computers growing doubly exponentially in time, given that the number of qubits on current quantum computers is currently growing exponentially with time. The first book's sequel, "Schrödinger's Web: Race to Build the Quantum Internet", has been released posthumously.

Dowling co-authored a 2003 paper which predicted a boom in quantum technologies.
