= Xuemei May Cheng =

Chinese-American physicist

Xuemei May Cheng is a Chinese and American condensed-matter physicist whose research topics have included the study of nanomaterials, spintronics, quantum sensors, and the application of synchrotron x-rays in materials science. She works at Bryn Mawr College as a professor of physics and as the Rachel C. Hale Professor in the Sciences and Mathematics.

== Education and career ==
Cheng was born in Huai'an, in a family with many engineers and educators. She studied physics and microelectronics at Nanjing University, receiving a bachelor's degree in physics in 1997 and a master's degree in microelectronics in 2000. She continued her studies in physics at Johns Hopkins University, receiving a second master's degree in 2004 and completing her Ph.D. in 2006 in Condensed Matter Physics. Her dissertation, Magnetization reversal and magnetotransport properties of cobalt/platinum multilayers with perpendicular magnetic anisotropy, was supervised by Dr. Chia-Ling Chien.

After postdoctoral research at the Argonne National Laboratory from 2006 to 2009, she joined Bryn Mawr College as an assistant professor of physics in 2009. She was promoted to associate chair in 2015, and full professor in 2021. She served as chair of the physics department from 2016 to 2018 and 2020 to 2021, and was dean of graduate studies from 2021 to 2025. She was named as Rachel C. Hale Professor in 2023.

== Recognition ==
Cheng was named as a Fellow of the American Physical Society (APS) in 2025, after a nomination from the APS Topical Group on Magnetism and Its Applications, "for broad contributions to magnetism and spintronics in nanoscale, soft, and bio-inspired materials; for advancing synchrotron-based techniques; and for exceptional commitment to undergraduate education and mentorship and broadening participation in physics".
