= Quantum sensor =

Device measuring quantum mechanical effects

Within quantum technology, a quantum sensor utilizes quantum mechanical phenomena, such as quantum superposition, quantum entanglement, and quantum squeezing, to measure physical quantities. If a quantum system is measurable, and it interacts with its environment in a known way, then measurements of that system can provide information about its environment. Theoretically such sensor technology would have precision limited only by the uncertainty principle. The field of quantum sensing deals with the design and engineering of quantum mechanical systems and measurements with potential for better performance than any classical strategy in a number of technological applications. Of the wide range of quantum mechanical systems that can be used as a quantum sensor, most can be classified as photonic systems or solid state systems.

== Characteristics ==
In photonics and quantum optics, photonic quantum sensing leverages entanglement, single photons and squeezed states to perform extremely precise measurements. Optical sensing makes use of continuously variable quantum systems such as different degrees of freedom of the electromagnetic field, vibrational modes of solids, and Bose–Einstein condensates. These quantum systems can be probed to characterize an unknown transformation between two quantum states. Several methods are in place to improve photonic sensors' quantum illumination of targets, which have been used to improve detection of weak signals by the use of quantum correlation.

Quantum sensors are often built on continuously variable systems, i.e., quantum systems characterized by continuous degrees of freedom such as position and momentum quadratures. The basic working mechanism typically relies on optical states of light, often involving quantum mechanical properties such as squeezing or two-mode entanglement. These states are sensitive to physical transformations that are detected by interferometric measurements.

Quantum sensing can also be utilized in non-photonic areas such as spin qubits, trapped ions, flux qubits, and nanoparticles. These systems can be compared by physical characteristics to which they respond, for example, trapped ions respond to electrical fields while spin systems will respond to magnetic fields. Trapped Ions are useful in their quantized motional levels which are strongly coupled to the electric field. They have been proposed to study electric field noise above surfaces, and more recently, rotation sensors.

In solid-state physics, a quantum sensor is a quantum device that responds to a stimulus. Usually this refers to a sensor, which has quantized energy levels, uses quantum coherence or entanglement to improve measurements beyond what can be done with classical sensors. There are four criteria for solid-state quantum sensors:

1. The system has to have discrete, resolvable energy levels.
2. The sensor can be initialized into a well-known state and its state can be read out.
3. The sensor can be coherently manipulated.
4. The sensor interacts with a physical quantity and has some response to that quantity.

== Research and applications ==
Quantum sensors have applications in a wide variety of fields including microscopy, positioning systems, communication technology, electric and magnetic field sensors. Many measurement devices utilize quantum properties in order to probe measurements such as atomic clocks, atomic radio receivers, superconducting quantum interference devices, and nuclear magnetic resonance spectroscopy. With new technological advancements, individual quantum systems can be used as measurement devices, utilizing entanglement, superposition, interference and squeezing to enhance sensitivity and surpass performance of classical strategies.

A good example of an early quantum sensor is an avalanche photodiode (APD). APDs have been used to detect entangled photons. With additional cooling and sensor improvements can be used where photomultiplier tubes (PMT) in fields such as medical imaging. APDs, in the form of 2-D and even 3-D stacked arrays, can be used as a direct replacement for conventional sensors based on silicon diodes.

The U.S. Defense Advanced Research Projects Agency (DARPA) launched a research program in optical quantum sensors that seeks to exploit ideas from quantum metrology and quantum imaging, such as quantum lithography and the NOON state, in order to achieve these goals with optical sensor systems such as lidar. The United States judges quantum sensing to be the most mature of quantum technologies for military use, theoretically replacing GPS in areas without coverage or possibly acting with ISR capabilities or detecting submarine or subterranean structures or vehicles, as well as nuclear material.

=== Photonic quantum sensors, microscopy and gravitational wave detectors ===
For photonic systems, current areas of research consider feedback and adaptive protocols. This is an active area of research in discrimination and estimation of bosonic loss.

Injecting squeezed light into interferometers allows for higher sensitivity to weak signals that would be unable to be classically detected. A practical application of quantum sensing is realized in gravitational wave sensing. Gravitational wave detectors, such as LIGO, utilize squeezed light to measure signals below the standard quantum limit. Squeezed light has also been used to detect signals below the standard quantum limit in plasmonic sensors and atomic force microscopy.

=== Uses of projection noise removal ===
Quantum sensing also has the capability to overcome resolution limits, where current issues of vanishing distinguishability between two close frequencies can be overcome by making the projection noise vanish. The diminishing projection noise has direct applications in communication protocols and nano-Nuclear Magnetic Resonance.

=== Other uses of entanglement ===
Entanglement can be used to improve upon existing atomic clocks or create more sensitive magnetometers.

=== Quantum radars ===
Quantum radar is also an active area of research. Current classical radars can interrogate many target bins while quantum radars are limited to a single polarization or range. A proof-of-concept quantum radar or quantum illuminator using quantum entangled microwaves was able to detect low reflectivity objects at room-temperature – such may be useful for improved radar systems, security scanners and medical imaging systems.

=== Neuroimaging ===
In neuroimaging, the first quantum brain scanner uses magnetic imaging and could become a novel whole-brain scanning approach.

=== Gravity cartography of subterraneans ===
Quantum gravity-gradiometers that could be used to map and investigate subterraneans are also in development.

== See also ==
- Quantum metrology – application of quantum entanglement to high-precision measurement
- Quantum compass – atom-based system to determine relative location
