= Quantum imaging =

Use of quantum correlations to image objects

Quantum imaging is a new sub-field of quantum optics that exploits quantum correlations such as quantum entanglement of the electromagnetic field in order to image objects with a resolution or other imaging criteria that is beyond what is possible in classical optics. Examples of quantum imaging are quantum ghost imaging, quantum lithography, imaging with undetected photons, sub-shot-noise imaging, and quantum sensing. Quantum imaging may someday be useful for storing patterns of data in quantum computers and transmitting large amounts of highly secure encrypted information. Quantum mechanics has shown that light has inherent "uncertainties" in its features, manifested as moment-to-moment fluctuations in its properties. Controlling these fluctuations—which represent a sort of "noise"—can improve detection of faint objects, produce better amplified images, and allow workers to more accurately position laser beams.

== Quantum imaging methods ==
Quantum imaging can be done in different methods. One method uses scattered light from a free-electron laser. This method converts the light to quasi-monochromatic pseudo-thermal light. Another method known as interaction-free imaging is used to locate an object without absorbing photons. One more method of quantum imaging is known as ghost imaging. This process uses a photon pair to define an image. The image is created by correlations between the two photons, the stronger the correlations the greater the resolution.

Quantum lithography is a type of quantum imaging that focuses on aspects of photons to surpass the limits of classical lithography. Using entangled light, the effective resolution becomes a factor of N lesser than the Rayleigh limit of $\Delta x = \frac{\lambda}{2}$. Another study determines that waves created by Raman pulses have narrower peaks and have a width that is four times smaller than the diffraction limit in classical lithography. Quantum lithography has potential applications in communications and computing.

Another type of quantum imaging is called quantum metrology, or quantum sensing. The goal of these processes is to achieve higher levels of accuracy than equivalent measurements from classical optics. They take advantage of quantum properties of individual particles or quantum systems to create units of measurement. By doing this, quantum metrology enhances the limits of accuracy beyond classical attempts.

=== Photonics ===
In photonics and quantum optics, quantum sensors are often built on continuous variable systems, i.e., quantum systems characterized by continuous degrees of freedom such as position and momentum quadratures. The basic working mechanism typically relies on using optical states of light which have squeezing or two-mode entanglement. These states are particularly sensitive to record physical transformations that are finally detected by interferometric measurements.

==== In practice ====
===== Absolute photon sources =====
Many of the procedures for executing quantum metrology require certainty in the measurement of light. An absolute photon source is knowing the origin of the photon which helps determine which measurements relate for the sample being imaged. The best methods for approaching an absolute photon source is through spontaneous parametric down-conversion (SPDC). Coincidence measurements are a key component for reducing noise from the environment by factoring in the amount of the incident photons registered with respect to the photon number. However, this is not a perfected system as error can still exist through inaccurate detection of the photons.

==== Types of quantum metrology ====
===== Quantum ellipsometry =====
Classical ellipsometry is a thin film material characterization methodology used to determine reflectivity, phase shift, and thickness resulting from light shining on a material. Though, it can only be effectively used if the properties are well known for the user to reference and calibrate. Quantum ellipsometry has the distinct advantage of not requiring the properties of the material to be well-defined for calibration. This is because any detected photons will already have a relative phase relation with another detected photon assuring the measured light is from the material being studied.

===== Quantum optical coherence tomography (QOCT) =====
Optical coherence tomography uses Michelson interferometry with a distance adjustable mirror. Coherent light passes through a beam splitter where one path hits the mirror then the detector and the other hits a sample then reflects into the detector. The quantum analogue uses the same premise with entangle photons and a Hong–Ou–Mandel interferometer. Coincidence counting of the detected photons permits more recognizable interference leading to less noise and higher resolution.

== Real-world applications ==
As research in quantum imaging continues, more and more real-world methods arise. Two important ones are ghost imaging and quantum illumination. Ghost imaging takes advantage of two light detectors to create an image of an object that is not directly visible to the naked eye. The first detector is a multi-pixel detector that does not view the subject object while the second, a single-pixel (bucket) detector, views the object. The performance is measured through the resolution and signal-to-noise ratio (SNR). SNRs are important to determine how well an image looks as a result of ghost imaging. On the other hand, resolution and the attention to detail is determined by the number of "specks" in the image. Ghost imaging is important as it allows an image to be produced when a traditional camera is not sufficient.

Quantum Illumination was first introduced by Seth Lloyd and collaborators at MIT in 2008 and takes advantage of quantum states of light. The basic setup is through target detection in which a sender prepares two entangled system, signal and idler. The idler is kept in place while the signal is sent to check out an object with a low-reflective rate and high noise background. A reflection of the object is sent back and then the idler and reflected signal combined to create a joint measurement to tell the sender one of two possibilities: an object is present or an object is absent. A key feature of quantum illumination is entanglement between the idler and reflected signal is lost completely. Therefore, it is heavily reliant on the presence of entanglement in the initial idler-signal system.

== Current uses ==
Quantum imaging is expected to have a lot of potential to expand. In the future, it could be used to store patterns of data in quantum computers and allow communication through highly encrypted information. Quantum imaging techniques can allow improvement in detection of faint objects, amplified images, and accurate position of lasers. Today, quantum imaging (mostly ghost imaging) is studied and tested in areas of military and medical use. The military aims to use ghost imaging to detect enemies and objects in situations where the naked eye and traditional cameras fail. For example, if an enemy or object is hidden in a cloud of smoke or dust, ghost imaging can help an individual to know where a person is located and if they are an ally or foe. In the medical field, imaging is used to increase the accuracy and lessen the amount of radiation exposed to a patient during x-rays. Ghost imaging could allow doctors to look at a part of the human body without having direct contact with it, therefore, lowering the amount of direct radiation to the patient. Similar to the military, it is used to look at objects that cannot be seen with the human eye such as bones and organs with a light with beneficial properties.

== Bibliography ==
- Journal of Modern Optics. Abingdon: Taylor & Francis. 53 (5, Quantum Imaging). ISSN 0950-0340.
