= Quantum lithography =

Type of photolithography

Quantum lithography is a type of photolithography, which exploits non-classical properties of the photons, such as quantum entanglement, in order to achieve superior performance over ordinary classical lithography. Quantum lithography is closely related to the fields of quantum imaging, quantum metrology, and quantum sensing. The effect exploits the quantum mechanical state of light called the NOON state. Quantum lithography was invented at Jonathan P. Dowling's group at JPL, and has been studied by a number of groups.

Of particular importance, quantum lithography can beat the classical Rayleigh criterion for the diffraction limit. Classical photolithography has an optical imaging resolution that is limited by the wavelength of light used. For example, in the use of photolithography to mass-produce computer chips, it is desirable to produce smaller and smaller features on the chip, which classically requires moving to smaller and smaller wavelengths (ultraviolet and x-ray), which entails greater cost to produce the optical imaging systems at these extremely short optical wavelengths.

Quantum lithography exploits the quantum entanglement between specially prepared photons in the NOON state and special photoresists, that display multi-photon absorption processes to achieve the smaller resolution without the requirement of shorter wavelengths. For example, a beam of red photons, entangled 50 at a time in the NOON state, would have the same resolving power as a beam of x-ray photons.

The field of quantum lithography is in its infancy, and although experimental proofs of principle have been carried out using the Hong–Ou–Mandel effect, it is considered promising technology.
