= Atomic radio receiver =

An atomic radio receiver is a quantum sensor technology that uses Rydberg atoms as a radio frequency spectrum antenna. The device may have an advantage over conventional devices in noisy environments. The sensor has been used to build radios and television.

== Overview ==
The large electric dipole moments of Rydberg atoms make them sensitive to electric fields. Since the atom structure can be detected by light, information about the field can be extracted via electromagnetically induced transparency. A laser tuned to a specific frequency is applied to the rydberg atoms. This makes the atoms transparent. A second laser is then used to measure how much light is absorbed. The measurement of the amount of absorption with a photodiode or a photodetector is used to monitor changes in the radio waves which can be converted to audio.

== See also ==
- Quantum sensor
