= Quantum optical coherence tomography =

Quantum optical coherence tomography (Q-OCT) is an imaging technique that uses nonclassical (quantum) light sources to generate high-resolution images based on the Hong-Ou-Mandel effect (HOM). Q-OCT is similar to conventional OCT but uses a fourth-order interferometer that incorporates two photodetectors rather than a second-order interferometer with a single photodetector. The primary advantage of Q-OCT over OCT is insensitivity to even-order dispersion in multi-layered and scattering media.

Several quantum sources of light have been developed so far. An example of such nonclassical sources is spontaneous parametric down-conversion that generates entangled photon pairs (twin-photon). The entangled photons are emitted in pairs and have stronger-than-classical temporal and spatial correlations. The entangled photons are anti-correlated in frequencies and directions. However, the nonclassical light sources are expensive and limited, several quantum-mimetic light sources are developed by classical light and nonlinear optics, which mimic dispersion cancellation and unique additional benefits.

== Theory ==
The principle of Q-OCT is fourth-order interferometry. The optical setup is based on a Hong ou Mandel (HOM) interferometer with a nonclassical light source. Twin photons travel into and recombined from reference and sample arm and the coincidence rate is measured with time delay.

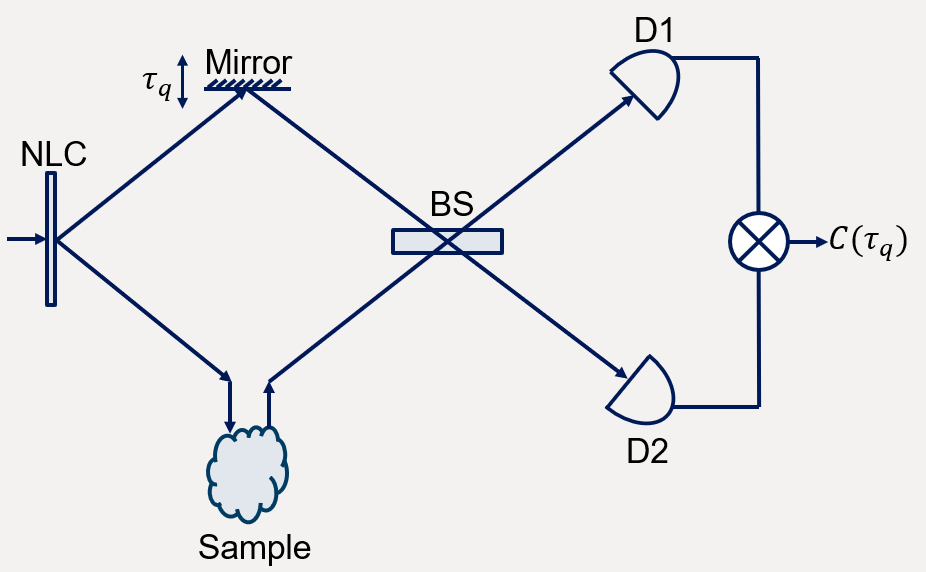
Hong-Ou-Mandel interferometer

The nonlinear crystal is pumped by a laser and generates photon pairs with anti-correlation in frequency. One photon travels through the sample and the other through a delay time before the interferometer. The photon-coincidence rate at the output ports of the beam splitter is measure as a function of length difference ($c\tau_q$) by a pair of single-photon-counting detectors and a coincidence counter.

Due to the quantum destructive interference, both photons emerge from the same port when the optical path lengths are equal. The coincidence rate has a sharp dip when the optical path length difference is zero. Such dips are used to monitor the reflectance of the sample as a function of depth.

The twin-photon source is characterized by the frequency-entangled state:

$\left | \psi \right\rangle = \int \,d \Omega \zeta (\Omega) \left | \omega_0 + \Omega \right\rangle_1 \left | \omega_0 - \Omega \right\rangle_2,$

where $\Omega$ is the angular frequency deviation about the central angular frequency $\omega_0$ of the twin-photon wave packet, $\zeta (\Omega)$ is the spectral probability amplitude.

A reflecting sample is described by a transfer function:

$H(\omega) = \int\limits_{0}^{\infty} \,d z r(z,\omega)e^{i2\phi(z,\omega)},$

where $H(\omega) = r(z,\omega)$ is the complex reflection coefficient from depth $z$,

The coincidence rate $C(\tau_q)$ is then given by

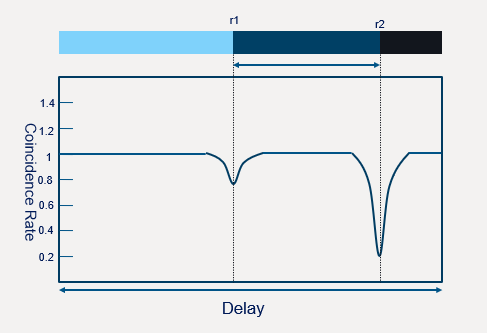
A-scan plot of the quantum optical coherence tomography

$C(\tau_q) \propto \Lambda_0 - Re{\Lambda(2\tau_q)},$

where

$\Lambda_0 = \int \,d\Omega |H(\omega_0 + \Omega)|^2 S(\Omega)$,

and

$\Lambda(\tau_q) = \int \,d\Omega H(\omega_0 + \Omega) H^{\ast}(\omega_0 - \Omega) S(\Omega)e^{-i\Omega\tau_q},$

represent the constant (self-interference) and varying contributions (cross-interference).

Dips in the coincidence rate plot arise from reflections from each of the two surfaces. When two photons have equal overall path lengths, the destructive interference of the two photon-pair probability amplitude occurs.

== Advantages ==
Compared with conventional OCT, Q-OCT has several advantages:

- greater signal-to-background ratio;
- intrinsic resolution enhancement by a factor of two for the same source bandwidth;
- interferogram components that are insensitive to even-order dispersion of the medium;
- interferogram components that are sensitive to the dispersion of the medium

== Applications ==
Similar to FD-OCT, Q-OCT can provide 3D imaging of biological samples with a better resolution due to the photon entanglement. Q-OCT permits a direct determination of the group-velocity dispersion (GVD) coefficients of the media. The development of quantum-mimetic light sources offers unique additional benefits to quantum imaging, such as enhanced signal-to-noise ratio, better resolution, and acquisition rate. Although Q-OCT is not expected to replace OCT, it does offer some advantages as a biological imaging paradigm.
