= Quantum radar =

New radar technology

Quantum radar is a remote-sensing technology based on quantum-mechanical effects, such as the uncertainty principle or quantum entanglement. Broadly speaking, a quantum radar can be seen as a device working in the microwave range, which exploits quantum features, from the point of view of the radiation source and/or the output detection, and is able to outperform a classical counterpart. One approach is based on the use of input quantum correlations (in particular, quantum entanglement) combined with a suitable interferometric quantum detection at the receiver (strongly related to the protocol of quantum illumination).

Paving the way for a technologically viable prototype of a quantum radar involves the resolution of a number of experimental challenges as discussed in some review articles, the latter of which pointed out "inaccurate reporting" in the media. Current experimental designs seem to be limited to very short ranges, of the order of one meter, suggesting that potential applications might instead be for near-distance surveillance or biomedical scanning.

== Concept behind a microwave-range model ==
A microwave-range model of a quantum radar was proposed in 2015 by an international team and is based on the protocol of Gaussian quantum illumination. The basic concept is to create a stream of entangled visible-frequency photons and split it in half. One half, the "signal beam", goes through a conversion to microwave frequencies in a way that preserves the original quantum state. The microwave signal is then sent and received as in a normal radar system. When the reflected signal is received it is converted back into visible photons and compared with the other half of the original entangled beam, the "idler beam".

Although most of the original entanglement will be lost due to quantum decoherence as the microwaves travel to the target objects and back, enough quantum correlations will still remain between the reflected-signal and the idler beams. Using a suitable quantum detection scheme, the system can pick out just those photons that were originally sent by the radar, completely filtering out any other sources. If the system can be made to work in the field, it represents an enormous advance in detection capability.

One way to defeat conventional radar systems is to broadcast signals on the same frequencies used by the radar, making it impossible for the receiver to distinguish between their own broadcasts and the spoofing signal (or "jamming"). However, such systems cannot know, even in theory, what the original quantum state of the radar's internal signal was. Lacking such information, their broadcasts will not match the original signal and will be filtered out in the correlator. Environmental sources, like ground clutter and aurora, will similarly be filtered out.

== History ==
One design was proposed in 2005 by defence contractor Lockheed Martin. The patent on this work was granted in 2013. The aim was to create a radar system providing a better resolution and higher detail than classical radar could provide. However no quantum advantage or better resolution was theoretically proven by this design.

In 2015, an international team of researchers, showed the first theoretical design of a quantum radar able to achieve a quantum advantage over a classical setup. In this model of quantum radar, one considers the remote sensing of a low-reflectivity target that is embedded within a bright microwave background, with detection performance well beyond the capability of a classical microwave radar. By using a suitable wavelength "electro-optomechanical converter", this scheme generates excellent quantum entanglement between a microwave signal beam, sent to probe the target region, and an optical idler beam, retained for detection. The microwave return collected from the target region is subsequently converted into an optical beam and then measured jointly with the idler beam. Such a technique extends the powerful protocol of quantum illumination to its more natural spectral domain, namely microwave wavelengths.

In 2019, a three-dimensional enhancement quantum radar protocol was proposed. It could be understood as a quantum metrology protocol for the localization of a non-cooperative point-like target in three-dimensional space. It employed quantum entanglement to achieve an uncertainty in localization that is quadratically smaller for each spatial direction than what could be achieved by using independent, unentangled photons.

Review articles that delve more into the history and designs of quantum radar, in addition to the ones mentioned in the introduction above, are available on arXiv.

A quantum radar is challenging to be realized with current technology, even though a preliminary experimental prototype has been realized.

== Challenges and limitations ==
There are a number of non-trivial challenges behind the experimental implementation of a truly-quantum radar prototype, even at short ranges. According to current quantum illumination designs, an important point is the management of the idler pulse that, ideally, should be jointly detected together with the signal pulse returning from the potential target. However, this would require the use of a quantum memory with a long coherence time, able to work at times comparable with the round-trip of the signal pulse. Other solutions may degrade the quantum correlations between signal and idler pulses to a point where the quantum advantage may disappear. This is a problem that also affects optical designs of quantum illumination. For instance, storing the idler pulse in a delay line by using a standard optical fiber would degrade the system and limit the maximum range of a quantum illumination radar to about 11 km. This value has to be interpreted as a theoretical limit of this design, not to be confused with an achievable range. Other limitations include the fact that current quantum designs only consider a single polarization, azimuth, elevation, range, Doppler bin at a time. The main limitations of microwave Quantum Radar concerning the detection of conventional and stealth targets have been recently analysed in the paper "Range Limitations in Microwave Quantum Radar" by G. Pavan and G. Galati.

== Media speculation about applications ==
There is media speculation that a quantum radar could operate at long ranges detecting stealth aircraft, filter out deliberate jamming attempts, and operate in areas of high background noise, e.g., due to ground clutter. Related to the above, there is considerable media speculation of the use of quantum radar as a potential anti-stealth technology. Stealth aircraft are designed to reflect signals away from the radar, typically by using rounded surfaces and avoiding anything that might form a partial corner reflector. This so reduces the amount of signal returned to the radar's receiver that the target is (ideally) lost in the thermal background noise. Although stealth technologies will still be just as effective at reflecting the original signal away from the receiver of a quantum radar, it is the system's ability to separate out the remaining tiny signal, even when swamped by other sources, that allows it to pick out the return even from highly stealthy designs. At the moment these long-range applications are speculative and not supported by experimental data.

More recently, the generation of large numbers of entangled photons for radar detection has been studied by the University of Waterloo.
