= Pieter Kok =

Dutch physicist (born 1972)

- Born: June 1972 (age 54); Friesland, Netherlands
- Education: University of Utrecht; University of Wales, Bangor
- Scientific career
- Fields: Quantum information theory
- Thesis: State Preparation in Quantum Optics (2001)
- Doctoral advisor: Samuel L. Braunstein

Pieter Kok (born June 1972) is a Dutch physicist and one of the co-developers of quantum interferometric optical lithography. His research specializations include linear optical implementations of quantum communication and computation protocols, quantum teleportation and the interpretation of quantum theory. He is a Professor of Theoretical Physics at the University of Sheffield.

Professor Kok was born in Friesland, Netherlands, graduated from the University of Utrecht with a master's degree in Foundations of Quantum Theory, and later completed a PhD in physics from the University of Wales, Bangor in 2001. He has previously worked in the Quantum Computing Technologies Group at the NASA/Jet Propulsion Laboratory, in Pasadena, California, Hewlett-Packard Laboratories in Bristol, England and at the Department of Materials, University of Oxford.

== Selected publications ==
- Kok, Pieter; Lovett, Brendon W. (2010). Introduction to Optical Quantum Information Processing. ISBN 978-1-139-19365-8.
- Kok, Pieter (2023). A First Introduction to Quantum Physics. Springer. ISBN 978-3-031-16164-3.
- Barrett, Sean D.; Kok, Pieter (24 June 2005). "Efficient high-fidelity quantum computation using matter qubits and linear optics". Physical Review A. 71 (6) 060310. arXiv:quant-ph/0408040. Bibcode:2005PhRvA..71f0310B. doi:10.1103/PhysRevA.71.060310. S2CID 119407129.
- Boto, Agedi N.; Kok, Pieter; Abrams, Daniel S.; Braunstein, Samuel L.; Williams, Colin P.; Dowling, Jonathan P. (25 September 2000). "Quantum Interferometric Optical Lithography: Exploiting Entanglement to Beat the Diffraction Limit". Physical Review Letters. 85 (13): 2733–2736. arXiv:quant-ph/9912052. Bibcode:2000PhRvL..85.2733B. doi:10.1103/PhysRevLett.85.2733. PMID 10991220. S2CID 7373285.
- Campbell, Earl T; Fitzsimons, Joseph; Benjamin, Simon C; Kok, Pieter (29 June 2007). "Efficient growth of complex graph states via imperfect path erasure". New Journal of Physics. 9 (6): 196. arXiv:quant-ph/0702209. Bibcode:2007NJPh....9..196C. doi:10.1088/1367-2630/9/6/196. S2CID 59127514.
- Kok, Pieter; Barrett, Sean D; Spiller, Timothy P (1 July 2005). "Preparing multi-partite entanglement of photons and matter qubits". Journal of Optics B: Quantum and Semiclassical Optics. 7 (7): S166–S170. arXiv:quant-ph/0506164. Bibcode:2005JOptB...7S.166K. doi:10.1088/1464-4266/7/7/006. S2CID 119546665.
- Kok, Pieter; Lovett, Brendon W. (November 2006). "Qubits in the pink". Nature. 444 (7115): 49. doi:10.1038/444049a. PMID 17080080.
- Kok, Pieter; Munro, W. J.; Nemoto, Kae; Ralph, T. C.; Dowling, Jonathan P.; Milburn, G. J. (24 January 2007). "Linear optical quantum computing with photonic qubits". Reviews of Modern Physics. 79 (1): 135–174. arXiv:quant-ph/0512071. Bibcode:2007RvMP...79..135K. doi:10.1103/RevModPhys.79.135. S2CID 119335959.
