= Nonclassical light =

Light that cannot be described using classical electromagnetism

In optics, nonclassical light is light that cannot be described using classical electromagnetism; its characteristics are described by the quantized electromagnetic field and quantum mechanics.

The most common described forms of nonclassical light are the following:

- Photon statistics of nonclassical light is sub-Poissonian in the sense that the average number of photons in a photodetection of this kind of light shows a standard deviation that is less than the mean number of the photons.
- Squeezed light exhibits reduced noise in one quadrature component. The most familiar kinds of squeezed light have either reduced amplitude noise or reduced phase noise, with increased noise of the other component.
- Fock states (also called photon number states) have a well-defined number of photons (stored e.g. in a cavity), while the phase is totally undefined.

== Glauber–Sudarshan P representation ==
The density matrix for any state of light can be written as:

$$\widehat{\rho} = \int P(\alpha) |{\alpha}\rangle \langle {\alpha}| \rm{d}^2 \alpha,$$

where $\scriptstyle|\alpha\rangle$ is a coherent state. A classical state of light is one in which $\scriptstyle P(\alpha) \,$ is a probability density function. If it is not, the state is said to be nonclassical.

Aspects of $\scriptstyle P(\alpha) \,$ that would make it nonclassical are:

- a negative value at any point;
- being more singular than a Dirac delta function.

The matter is not quite simple. According to Leonard Mandel and Emil Wolf's book Optical Coherence and Quantum Optics: "The different coherent states are not [mutually] orthogonal, so that even if $\scriptstyle P(\alpha) \,$ behaved like a true probability density [function], it would not describe probabilities of mutually exclusive states."
