= Cardinal Warde =

Professor of Electrical Engineering

- Born: July 14, 1945 (age 81); Christ Church, Barbados
- Education: Yale University; Stevens Institute of Technology; Christ Church Foundation School (formerly Boy's Foundation School); Harrison College
- Known for: Optoelectronics
- Scientific career
- Workplaces: Massachusetts Institute of Technology
- Website: www.eecs.mit.edu/people/faculty/cardinal-warde

Cardinal Warde (born July 14, 1945) is a Professor of Electrical Engineering at Massachusetts Institute of Technology. He works on optoelectronic materials for information processing, communications and holography. Warde is involved with education policy in the Caribbean, acting as a scientific advisor for the Government of Barbados and helping high school students access science education.

== Early life and education ==
Warde was born in Christ Church, Barbados. His mother was Rosetta Irene Ward. He attended St. Christopher's Primary School and Harrison College. During school, Warde was involved with athletics. He converted his father's carpentry shop into a chemistry laboratory, where he built rockets with his friends from high school. Warde graduated from Harrison College in 1965, when he moved to America to start his undergraduate studies. Warde was a physics major at Stevens Institute of Technology, which he graduated in 1969. Warde was a brother in Pi Lambda Phi and played varsity soccer. Warde moved to Yale University for his graduate studies, where he worked on the refractive index of solid oxygen films, and earned his doctorate in 1974. At Yale University Warde developed a new interferometer that could operate close to absolute zero.

== Research and career ==
Warde was appointed to the faculty at Massachusetts Institute of Technology in 1974. He was one of the first minority faculty members, and one of the first black tenured professors. He was promoted to Professor of Electrical Engineering in 1982. He worked on the applications of optics to engineering, including optical computing, wireless communication and holography. He developed optical neural network processes to power computers and membrane-mirror based spatial light modulators for optical switching. His research is supported by the National Science Foundation. He founded Optron Systems in 1982, a start-up incubator that developed MicroElectroMechanical Systems (MEMS) displays. Optron Systems specialised in optoelectronic systems, which use light for information processing. He didn't hire his first employee until 1983, raising all the money himself from teaching and consulting, and was worth $3 million in 1986. In 1999 he co-founded Radiant Images, Inc, that created liquid-crystal VLSI displays. Radiant Images was acquired by Hoya Corporation.

At MIT, Warde has served as Faculty Director of the Minority Introduction to Engineering and Science program since 1997. The program is a six-week long program for gifted students from underrepresented minority students. He served as editor of The Journal of Display Technology and is a Fellow of The Optical Society.

Alongside his research, Warde works with the Caribbean government to build economic development in the Caribbean. He serves as the Government of Barbados scientific advisor. He is the interim executive director of the Caribbean Diaspora for Science, Technology & Innovation (CADSTI). He is the Executive Director of the Caribbean Science Foundation. He has worked with the United States Department of State and Imperial College London on programs that support science and engineering to school students.

In 2018 Warde established the Rosetta Irene Ward Memorial Scholarship Fund, which supports the higher education of students from English speaking Caribbean countries.

=== Awards and honours ===
His awards and honours include;

- 2017 Stevens Institute of Technology Distinguished Alumni Award
- 2014 Barbados Prime Minister's Award for Excellence
- 2007 Institute of Caribbean Studies Caribbean American Heritage Award
- 2003 Companion of Honour of Barbados
- 2001 Black Chamber of Commerce Innovator of the Year
- 2000 National Association of Barbados Organizations Pride of Barbados Award for Science
- 1996 Stevens Institute of Technology Renaissance Science and Engineering Award

He has been awarded honorary doctorates from the University of the West Indies and the Universidad Carlos III de Madrid.

=== Patents ===
Warde holds several patents, including;

- 2004 High angular deflection micro-mirror system
- 2002 Tunable optical filter
- 1991 Membrane light modulation systems
- 1989 Charge transfer signal processor and charge transfer feedthrough plate fabrication assembly and method
- 1988 Completely cross-talk free high spatial resolution 2D bistable light modulation
- 1986 Charge transfer signal processor
