= Quantum illumination =

Quantum information paradigm

Quantum illumination is a paradigm for target detection that employs quantum entanglement between a signal electromagnetic mode and an idler electromagnetic mode, as well as joint measurement of these modes. The signal mode is propagated toward a region of space, and it is either lost or reflected, depending on whether a target is absent or present, respectively. In principle, quantum illumination can be beneficial even if the original entanglement is completely destroyed by a lossy and noisy environment.

== Introduction ==
Many quantum information applications, such as quantum teleportation, quantum error correction, and superdense coding, rely on entanglement. However, entanglement is a fragile quantum property between particles and can be easily destroyed by loss and noise arising from interaction with the environment, leading to quantum decoherence. Even though entanglement itself may not survive, the residual correlation between the two initially entangled systems remains much higher than any initial classical states can provide. This implies that the use of entanglement should not be dismissed in entanglement-breaking scenarios.

Quantum illumination takes advantage of this stronger-than-classical residual correlations between two systems to achieve a performance enhancement over all schemes based on transmitting classical states with comparable power levels. Quantum illumination has been proven to be particularly useful in very noisy environments.

== History ==
=== Theory ===
The concept of quantum illumination was introduced by Seth Lloyd and collaborators at MIT in 2008. This included a discrete-variable version and a continuous-variable version developed in collaboration with Jeffrey Shapiro, Stefano Pirandola, Saikat Guha and others, the latter version being based on Gaussian states.

The basic setup of quantum illumination is target detection. Here the sender prepares two entangled systems, called signal and idler. The idler is retained while the signal is sent to probe the presence of a low-reflectivity object in a region with bright background noise. The reflection from the object is then combined with the retained idler system in a joint quantum measurement providing two possible outcomes: object present or object absent. More precisely, the probing process is repeated many times so that many pairs of signal-idler systems are collected at the receiver for the joint quantum detection.

The advantage of the scheme is evident at low energies where the mean number of photons in each signal system is very low (of the order of one photon or less). In this case, at fixed low energy, the probability of success in detecting a target has a remarkable improvement with respect to classical detection schemes, where entanglement is not used and signal systems are prepared in coherent states (technically, there is a 6 dB improvement in the error exponent). A key feature of quantum illumination is that the entanglement between the idler system and the reflected signal system is completely lost in the process. However, the residual quantum correlations between these two systems (idler-reflected signal) remain so strong that they could only be created by the presence of entanglement in the initial systems (idler-signal). Because the reflected signal is quantum-correlated with the retained idler system, it can be distinguished among all the uncorrelated background thermal photons that are also received by the detector. Because of this quantum labeling of the systems, the detection of quantum illumination is very efficient.

In 2015, an international collaboration coordinated by Stefano Pirandola extended the protocol of quantum illumination to the microwave frequencies, thus providing the first theoretical prototype of quantum radar.

The original proposal from was analyzed in the Bayesian setting of hypothesis testing, in which prior probabilities are assigned to the hypotheses that the target is absent or present. In 2017, a research paper analyzed quantum illumination in the Neyman-Pearson or asymmetric setting of hypothesis testing, which is a setting of interest in quantum radar applications. It was found that the performance gains of quantum illumination are even greater than those from.

In 2017, an optimum receiver design was proposed by Quntao Zhuang, Zheshen Zhang, and Jeffrey Shapiro. Quantum illumination has also been extended to the scenario of target fading.

In 2020, the ultimate limits for quantum illumination, allowing for an arbitrary number of optical modes entangled with a quantum memory were derived by Ranjith Nair and Mile Gu for all levels of background noise. The results also showed that the 6 dB improvement cannot be surpassed - and is only achievable for very large background noise.

==== Related work on secure communication ====
In 2009, a secure communication scheme based on quantum illumination was proposed. This scheme is a variant of the quantum cryptographic protocols based on continuous variables and two-way quantum communication introduced by Stefano Pirandola, Seth Lloyd and collaborators in 2008.

=== Experiment ===
In 2013, Lopaeva et al. exploited photon number correlations, instead of entanglement, in a sub-optimal target detection experiment. To illustrate the benefit of quantum entanglement, in 2013 Zhang et al. reported a secure communication experiment based on quantum illumination and demonstrated for the first time that entanglement can enable a substantial performance advantage in the presence of quantum decoherence. In 2015, Zhang et al. applied quantum illumination in sensing and showed that employing entanglement can yield a higher signal-to-noise ratio than the optimal classical scheme can provide, even though the highly lossy and noisy environment completely destroys the initial entanglement. This sensing experiment thus proved the original theoretical proposals of quantum illumination. The first experimental effort to perform microwave quantum illumination was based on using Josephson parametric amplifier and a digital receiver. As applied to imaging, in 2019 England et al. demonstrated this principle by imaging through noise in a scanning configuration. The first full-field imaging system based on quantum illumination that uses spatially entangled photon pairs for imaging in the presence of noise and losses was reported in a two successive publications in 2019 and 2020 by two research groups from the University of Glasgow.

== Applications ==
Potential applications of quantum illumination include target detection in high background noise environments, but also ultra-sensitive biological imaging and sensing, and secure communication.

== Media reporting ==
Several news articles on quantum illumination have appeared in popular science media, with the goal of elucidating the concept of quantum illumination in less technical terms.
