= Ghost imaging =

Combining information from two detectors

Ghost imaging (also called "coincidence imaging", "two-photon imaging" or "correlated-photon imaging") is a technique that produces an image of an object by combining information from two light detectors: a conventional, multi-pixel detector that does not view the object, and a single-pixel (bucket) detector that does view the object. Two techniques have been demonstrated. A quantum method uses a source of pairs of entangled photons, each pair shared between the two detectors, while a classical method uses a pair of correlated coherent beams without exploiting entanglement. Both approaches may be understood within the framework of a single theory.

== History ==
The first demonstration of ghost imaging, performed by T. B. Pittman, Y. H. Shih, D. V. Strekalov, and A. V. Sergienko in 1995, was based on quantum correlations between entangled photon pairs. One of the photons of the pair strikes the object and then the bucket detector while the other follows a different path to a (multi-pixel) camera. The camera is constructed to only record pixels from entangled photon pairs that hit both the bucket detector and the camera's image plane (as opposed to entangled photon pairs where one hit the image plane but the other does not hit the bucket detector, which are not registered). Then a large number of registered entangled pairs gradually forms a full image.

Later experiments indicated that the correlations between the light beam that hits the camera and the beam that hits the object may be explained by purely classical physics. If quantum correlations are present, the signal-to-noise ratio of the reconstructed image can be improved. In 2009 'pseudothermal ghost imaging' and 'ghost diffraction' were demonstrated by implementing the 'computational ghost-imaging' scheme, which relaxed the need to evoke quantum correlations arguments for the pseudothermal source case.

Recently, it was shown that the principles of 'Compressed-Sensing' can be directly utilized to reduce the number of measurements required for image reconstruction in ghost imaging. This technique allows an N pixel image to be produced with far less than N measurements and may have applications in LIDAR and microscopy.

=== Advances in military research ===
The U.S. Army Research Laboratory (ARL) developed remote ghost imaging in 2007 with the goal of applying advanced technology to the ground, satellites and unmanned aerial vehicles. Ronald E. Meyers and Keith S. Deacon of ARL, received a patent in 2013 for their quantum imaging technology called, "System and Method for Image Enhancement and Improvement." The researchers received the Army Research and Development Achievement Award for outstanding research in 2009 with the first ghost image of a remote object.

== Mechanism ==
A simple example clarifies the basic principle of ghost imaging. Imagine two transparent boxes: one that is empty and one that has an object within it. The back wall of the empty box contains a grid of many pixels (i.e. a camera), while the back wall of the box with the object is a large single-pixel (a bucket detector). Next, shine laser light into a beamsplitter and reflect the two resulting beams such that each passes through the same part of its respective box at the same time. For example, while the first beam passes through the empty box to hit the pixel in the top-left corner at the back of the box, the second beam passes through the filled box to hit the top-left corner of the bucket detector.

Now imagine moving the laser beam around in order to hit each of the pixels at the back of the empty box, meanwhile moving the corresponding beam around the box with the object. While the first light beam will always hit a pixel at the back of the empty box, the second light beam will sometimes be blocked by the object and will not reach the bucket detector. A processor receiving a signal from both light detectors only records a pixel of an image when light hits both detectors at the same time. In this way, a silhouette image can be constructed, even though the light going towards the multi-pixel camera did not touch the object.

In this simple example, the two boxes are illuminated one pixel at a time. However, using quantum correlation between photons from the two beams, the correct image can also be recorded using complex light distributions. Also, the correct image can be recorded using only the single beam passing through a computer-controlled light modulator to a single-pixel detector.

== Applications ==
=== Bessel beam illumination ===
As of 2012, ARL scientists developed a diffraction-free light beam, also called Bessel beam illumination. In a paper published February 10, 2012, the team outlined their feasibility study of virtual ghost imaging using the Bessel beam, to address adverse conditions with limited visibility, such as cloudy water, jungle foliage, or around corners. Bessel beams produce concentric-circle patterns. When the beam is blocked or obscured along its trajectory, the original pattern eventually reforms to create a clear picture.

=== Imaging with very low light levels ===
The spontaneous parametric down-conversion (SPDC) process provides a convenient source of entangled-photon pairs with strong spatial correlations. Such heralded single photons can be used to achieve a high signal-to-noise ratio, virtually eliminating background counts from the recorded images. By applying principles of image compression and associated image reconstruction, high-quality images of objects can be formed from raw data with an average of fewer than one detected photon per image pixel.

=== Photon-sparse microscopy with infrared light ===
Infrared cameras that combine low-noise with single-photon sensitivity are not readily available. Infrared illumination of a vulnerable target with sparse photons can be combined with a camera counting visible photons through the use of ghost imaging with correlated photons that have significantly different wavelengths, generated by a highly non-degenerate SPDC process. Infrared photons with a wavelength of 1550 nm illuminate the target and are detected by an InGaAs/InP single-photon avalanche diode. The image data are recorded from the coincidently detected, position-correlated, visible photons with a wavelength of 460 nm using a highly efficient, low-noise, photon-counting camera. Light-sensitive biological samples can thereby be imaged.

=== Remote sensing ===
Ghost imaging is being considered for application in remote-sensing systems as a possible competitor with imaging laser radars (LIDAR). A theoretical performance comparison between a pulsed, computational ghost imager and a pulsed, floodlight-illumination imaging laser radar identified scenarios in which a reflective ghost-imaging system has advantages.

=== X-ray and electron ghost imaging ===
Ghost-imaging has been demonstrated for a variety of photon science applications. A ghost-imaging experiment for hard x-rays was recently achieved using data obtained at the European Synchrotron. Here, speckled pulses of x-rays from individual electron synchrotron bunches were used to generate a ghost-image basis, enabling proof-of-concept for experimental x-ray ghost imaging. At the same time that this experiment was reported, a Fourier-space variant of x-ray ghost imaging was published. Ghost imaging has also been proposed for X-ray FEL applications. Classical ghost imaging with compressive sensing has also been demonstrated with ultra-relativistic electrons.
