= Spontaneous parametric down-conversion =

Concept in quantum optics

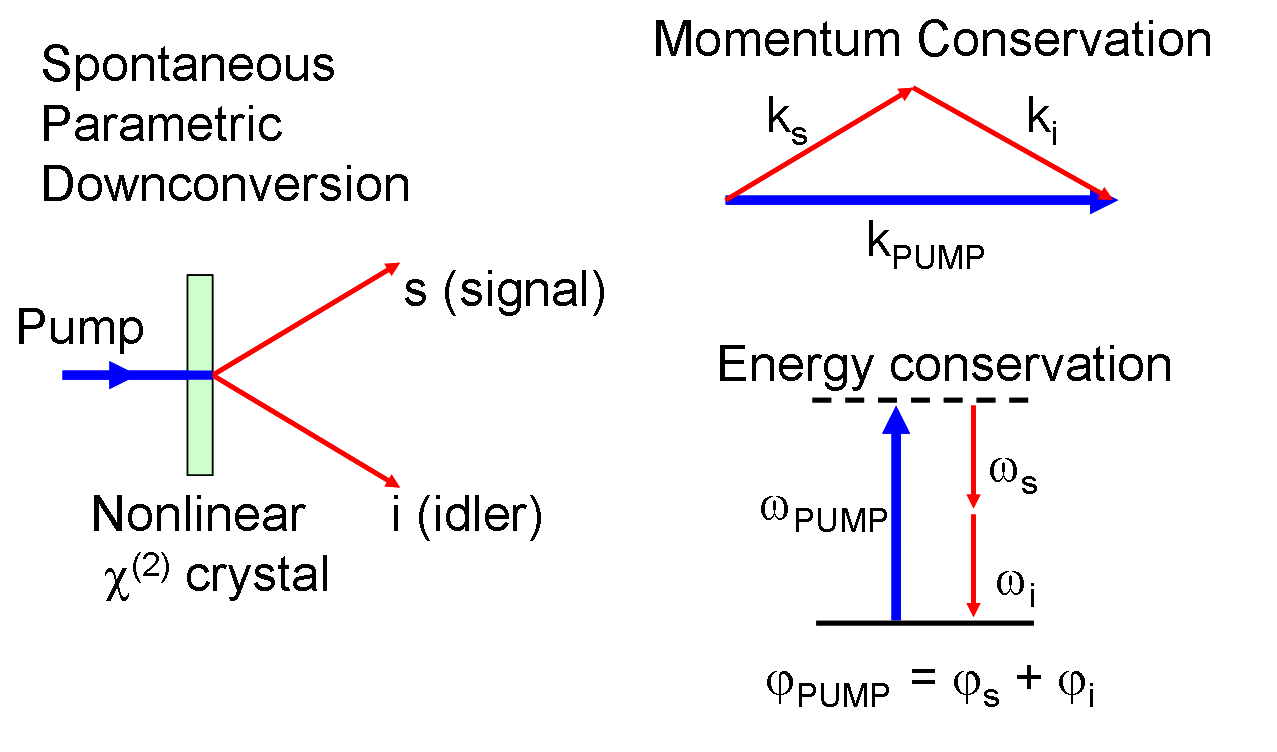
Schematic of SPDC process. Note that conservation laws are with respect to energy and momentum inside the crystal.

Spontaneous parametric down-conversion (also known as SPDC, parametric fluorescence or parametric scattering) is a nonlinear instant optical process that converts one photon of higher energy (namely, a pump photon) into a pair of photons (namely, signal and idler photons) of lower energy, in accordance with the laws of energy conservation and momentum conservation. It is an important process in quantum optics, for the generation of entangled photon pairs and of single photons.

== Description ==
An SPDC scheme with the Type I output

The video of an experiment showing vacuum fluctuations (in the red ring) amplified by SPDC (corresponding to the image above)

A nonlinear crystal is used to produce pairs of photons from a photon beam. In accordance with conservations of energy and momentum, the pairs need to have combined energies and momenta equal to the energy and momentum of the original photon. Because the index of refraction changes with frequency (dispersion), only certain triplets of frequencies will be phase-matched so that simultaneous energy and momentum conservation can be achieved. Phase-matching is most commonly achieved using birefringent nonlinear materials, whose index of refraction changes with polarization. As a result of this, different types of SPDC are categorized by the polarizations of the input photon (pump) and the two output photons (signal and idler).

- If the signal and idler photons share the same polarization with each other and the pump photon, it is deemed Type-0 SPDC.
- If the signal and idler photons share the same polarization with each other, but are orthogonal to the pump polarization, it is Type-I SPDC.
- If the signal and idler photons have perpendicular polarizations, it is deemed Type II SPDC.

The conversion efficiency of SPDC is typically very low, with the highest efficiency obtained on the order of 4×10^{−6} incoming photons for periodically poled lithium niobate (PPLN) in waveguides. However, if one half of the pair is detected at any time then its partner is known to be present. The degenerate portion of the output of a Type I down converter is a squeezed vacuum that contains only even photon number terms. The nondegenerate output of the Type II down converter is a two-mode squeezed vacuum.

== Example ==
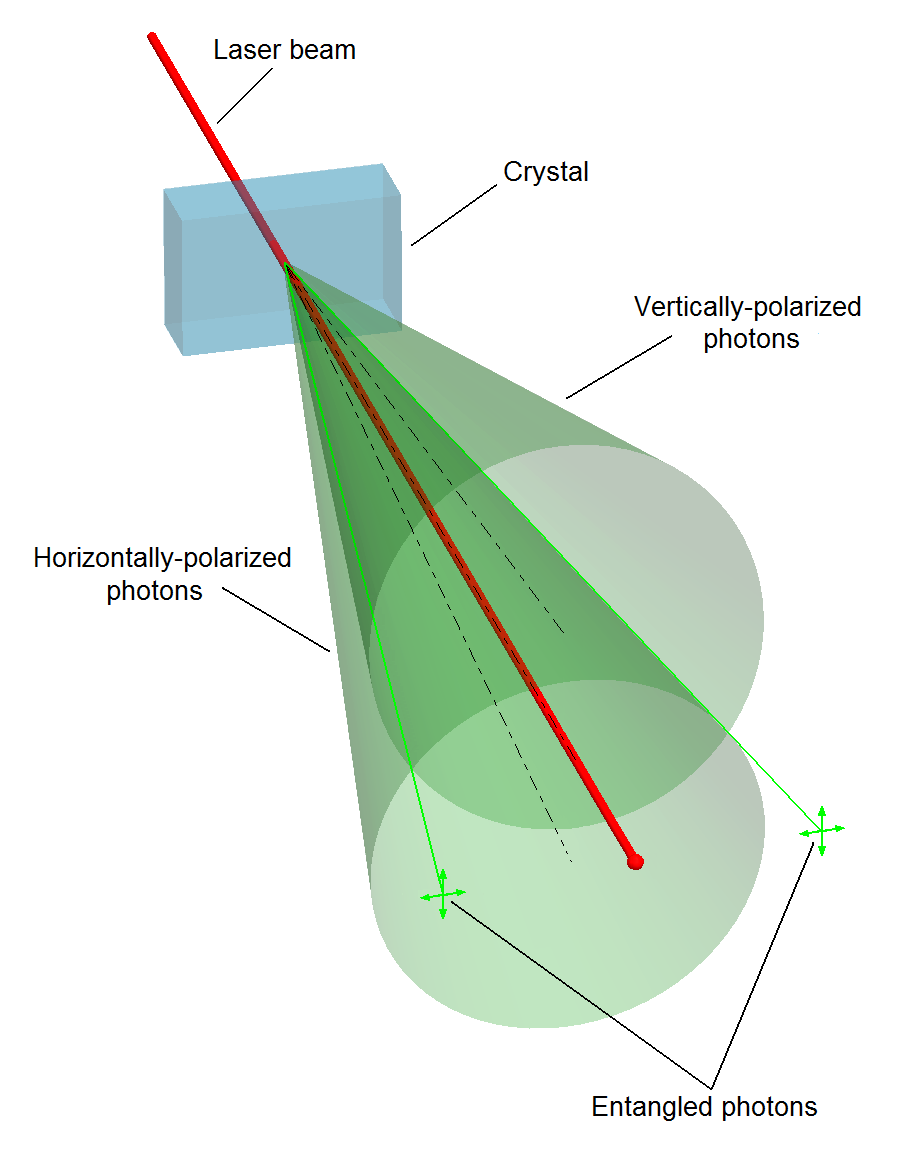
An SPDC scheme with the Type II output

In a commonly used SPDC apparatus design, a strong laser beam, termed the "pump" beam, is directed at a BBO (beta-barium borate) or lithium niobate crystal. Most of the photons continue straight through the crystal. However, occasionally, some of the photons undergo spontaneous down-conversion with Type II polarization correlation, and the resultant correlated photon pairs have trajectories that are constrained along the sides of two cones whose axes are symmetrically arranged relative to the pump beam. Due to the conservation of momentum, the two photons are always symmetrically located on the sides of the cones, relative to the pump beam. In particular, the trajectories of a small proportion of photon pairs will lie simultaneously on the two lines where the surfaces of the two cones intersect. This results in entanglement of the polarizations of the pairs of photons emerging on those two lines. The photon pairs are in an equal weight quantum superposition of the unentangled states $\vert H \rangle\vert V \rangle$ and $\vert V \rangle \vert H\rangle$, corresponding to polarizations of left-hand side photon, right-hand side photon.

Another crystal is KDP (potassium dihydrogen phosphate) which is mostly used in Type I down conversion, where both photons have the same polarization.

Some of the characteristics of effective parametric down-converting nonlinear crystals include:

1. Nonlinearity: The refractive index of the crystal changes with the intensity of the incident light. This is known as the nonlinear optical response.
2. Periodicity: The crystal has a regular, repeating structure. This is known as the lattice structure, which is responsible for the regular arrangement of the atoms in the crystal.
3. Optical anisotropy (or birefringence): The crystal has different refractive indices along different crystallographic axes.
4. Temperature and pressure sensitivity: The nonlinearity of the crystal can change with temperature and pressure, and thus the crystal should be kept in a stable temperature and pressure environment.
5. High nonlinear coefficient: Large nonlinear coefficient is desirable, this allow to generate a high number of entangled photons.
6. High optical damage threshold: Crystal with high optical damage threshold can endure high intensity of the pumping beam.
7. Transparency in the desired wavelength range: It is important for the crystal to be transparent in the wavelength range of the pump beam for efficient nonlinear interactions
8. High optical quality and low absorption: The crystal should possess a high optical quality and low absorption to minimize loss of the pump beam and the generated entangled photons.

== History ==
SPDC was demonstrated as early as 1967 by S. E. Harris, M. K. Oshman, and R. L. Byer, as well as by D. Magde and H. Mahr. In 1970, David C. Burnham and Donald L. Weinberg used coincidence counting to show that the two photons of a pair are produced simultaneously within the time resolution of the detectors. It was first applied to experiments related to coherence by two independent pairs of researchers in the late 1980s: Carroll Alley and Yanhua Shih, and Rupamanjari Ghosh and Leonard Mandel. The duality between incoherent (Van Cittert–Zernike theorem) and biphoton emissions was found.

== Applications ==
SPDC allows for the creation of optical fields containing (to a good approximation) a single photon. As of 2005, this is the predominant mechanism for an experimenter to create single photons (also known as Fock states). The single photons as well as the photon pairs are often used in quantum information experiments and applications like quantum cryptography and Bell test experiments.

SPDC is widely used to create pairs of entangled photons with a high degree of spatial correlation. Such pairs are used in ghost imaging, in which information is combined from two light detectors: a conventional, multi-pixel detector that does not view the object, and a single-pixel (bucket) detector that does view the object.

== Alternatives ==
The newly observed effect of two-photon emission from electrically driven semiconductors has been proposed as a basis for more efficient sources of entangled photon pairs. Other than SPDC-generated photon pairs, the photons of a semiconductor-emitted pair usually are not identical but have different energies. Until recently, within the constraints of quantum uncertainty, the pair of emitted photons were assumed to be co-located: they are born from the same location. However, a new nonlocalized mechanism for the production of correlated photon pairs in SPDC has highlighted that occasionally the individual photons that constitute the pair can be emitted from spatially separated points.

== See also ==
- Photon upconversion
