= National Quantum Computing Centre =

- Abbreviation: NQCC
- Formation: 2020
- Type: National laboratory
- Headquarters: Rutherford Appleton Laboratory, Harwell Campus, Oxfordshire, England
- Director: Michael Cuthbert
- Chief Scientist: Elham Kashefi
- Parent organization: UK Research and Innovation
- Website: www.nqcc.ac.uk

The National Quantum Computing Centre (NQCC) is the United Kingdom's national laboratory for quantum computing. It is part of UK Research and Innovation (UKRI) and is funded through the Engineering and Physical Sciences Research Council (EPSRC) and the Science and Technology Facilities Council (STFC). It is based at the Rutherford Appleton Laboratory on the Harwell Campus in Oxfordshire.

The centre was established in 2020 as part of the second phase of the UK National Quantum Technologies Programme. Its purpose-built facility was opened on 25 October 2024. The NQCC hosts and tests prototype quantum computers developed by companies, alongside systems built by its own scientists. In 2025 the UK government committed ten years of funding to the centre.

== History ==
=== Background and establishment ===
The centre originated in the October 2018 Budget presented by then Chancellor of the Exchequer Philip Hammond. It allocated £235 million to quantum technologies for the second phase of the National Quantum Technologies Programme, including £35 million to establish a national quantum computing centre. The centre was intended to complement the programme's existing research hubs.

In December 2018 the House of Commons Science and Technology Committee welcomed the decision to fund the centre. The Committee recommended that it should focus on developing software for quantum computers as well as hardware. Witnesses told the Committee that software had been under-represented in the programme's first phase. The NQCC was created within the second phase of the National Quantum Technologies Programme, a ten-year programme worth £1 billion. The programme was established in 2014. It is the earliest dedicated national quantum strategy shown in an OECD timeline of national strategies. The UK government has described it as the first of its kind in the world, as have the Netherlands Enterprise Agency and the Geneva Science and Diplomacy Anticipator.

An interim leadership team was announced in February 2020. Michael Cuthbert, previously of Oxford Instruments, was appointed director. Simon Benjamin of the University of Oxford became Deputy Director for Research. Ash Vadgama and Simon Plant became Deputy Directors for Operations and Innovation respectively. The Register reported that UKRI would provide £93 million over five years, including a building budget of £30 million. It noted that this was far smaller than the United States' National Quantum Initiative.

Science Minister Amanda Solloway formally launched the centre on 2 September 2020 at the Quantum Computing Summit during London Tech Week. Its technology roadmap aimed to provide user platforms of more than 100 qubits by 2025. UKRI appointed Hawkins\Brown to design the building in September 2020, with completion then expected in 2022. Cuthbert was confirmed as permanent director in 2021. Elham Kashefi was appointed Chief Scientist in November 2022.

The government's National Quantum Strategy, published in March 2023, gave the NQCC a prominent role. Its priority actions included increased investment in the centre, an additional £20 million over two years for its work, and using the centre as a "front door" for businesses and researchers seeking access to quantum computing resources.

=== Construction ===
A ground-breaking ceremony was held on 20 September 2021, led by Sir Peter Knight. At that time the building was expected to open in mid-2023. Main construction began in June 2022. In a 2024 interview Cuthbert said that the COVID-19 pandemic, the war in Ukraine and Brexit had disrupted supply chains and recruitment. He said their effect on the programme timetable had been limited to about six months.

=== Opening and subsequent developments ===
Science Minister Lord Vallance at the opening of the NQCC, 25 October 2024

Science Minister Lord Vallance opened the facility on 25 October 2024. At the opening the centre had more than 70 staff. The government said that, unlike many comparable facilities elsewhere, it would not be restricted to government use.

The NQCC's initial five-year programme concluded in March 2025. The centre then adopted a new governance structure. In June 2025 the government's Industrial Strategy committed more than £500 million to quantum computing over four years and £670 million over ten years. This included a decade of funding for the NQCC.

In November 2025 the NQCC became the anchor facility of the Harwell Quantum Cluster, an initiative led by STFC. In the same month it signed a memorandum of understanding with Japan's National Institute of Advanced Industrial Science and Technology. The Japanese government stated that the two organisations' testbeds would be used for joint evaluation, benchmarking, data sharing and supply chain assessment.

== Funding ==
The NQCC was established with an initial investment of £93 million from UKRI, delivered through EPSRC and STFC. UKRI later invested a further £50 million, including through its Technology Missions Fund. Its ten-year funding settlement forms part of the £670 million for quantum computing announced in the 2025 Industrial Strategy.

== Facility ==
The NQCC building has a floor area of about 4,000 square metres. Its ground-floor laboratories sit on foundations designed to isolate quantum systems from vibration and electromagnetic interference.

At its opening the facility was intended to house twelve quantum computers. These comprised seven testbeds funded through the NQCC, a distributed quantum computing project with Nu Quantum, a photonic system from ORCA Computing for the Ministry of Defence and the Defence Science and Technology Laboratory, and three systems built by the NQCC itself. The NQCC also operates an Innovation Hub on the Harwell Campus.

== Quantum computing testbeds ==
In February 2024 Science Minister Andrew Griffith announced £30 million of contracts for seven companies to build quantum computing testbeds at the NQCC by March 2025. The competition was run by Innovate UK and funded by the UKRI Technology Missions Fund and the NQCC. The OECD has cited the competition as an example of how governments support quantum testbeds. The testbeds cover five qubit technologies:

- Neutral atoms: Infleqtion and QuEra Computing
- Photonics: Aegiq and ORCA Computing
- Trapped ions: Oxford Ionics, later part of IonQ
- Superconducting circuits: Rigetti Computing
- Silicon spin qubits: Quantum Motion

A study by the Institute for Manufacturing at the University of Cambridge described the NQCC as acting as a "lead customer" for the testbed providers. Participants noted the programme's openness to companies from outside the UK. By November 2025 all seven testbeds had been delivered and technical evaluation had begun.

== Research ==
The NQCC carries out its own hardware research. It operates laboratories for superconducting, trapped-ion and neutral-atom qubits, together with a high-performance computing cluster. With the National Physical Laboratory it launched QCMet, an open-source repository for benchmarking quantum computers. The centre assesses devices using a measure it calls the "quantum operation" (QuOp), the number of operations a device can perform in one computation before its qubits lose coherence. Cuthbert has said that he does not expect a single hardware approach to prevail in the foreseeable future.

== Programmes ==
The NQCC's main user engagement programme, SparQ, supports companies and researchers exploring applications of quantum computing. Its Quantum Computing Access Programme gives UK universities and partners cloud access to machines from IBM, Rigetti, IonQ and D-Wave. The IBM arrangement was announced in November 2023.

The centre runs an annual UK Quantum Hackathon, held for the fourth time in 2025. With EPSRC it funds a doctoral studentship scheme for 30 students over five cohorts. At its opening the government described its apprenticeship scheme as the world's first dedicated quantum apprenticeship programme. In March 2024 the government announced five new Centres for Doctoral Training in quantum technologies, as part of a wider investment in doctoral training. The NQCC said it would work closely with these centres and support them through dedicated training packages, community events and access to quantum computing resources.

In August 2024 the NQCC published its STATES principles for the responsible and ethical development and use of quantum computing. It also established the Responsible Quantum Industry Forum, co-chaired by UKQuantum and techUK.

== Partnerships ==
In April 2023 the NQCC and the University of Edinburgh opened the Quantum Software Lab in the University's School of Informatics. It was the NQCC's first software lab and is led by Kashefi. In March 2026 the UK government announced £20 million for a four-year programme led by the lab in collaboration with the NQCC. The NQCC has also signed memoranda of understanding with the National Physical Laboratory and Oxford Quantum Circuits.

== Governance and leadership ==
Since 2025 the NQCC has been governed by three bodies:

- a Programme Oversight Board, chaired by EPSRC's Deputy Director for Future Communications and Quantum Technologies
- a Strategic Advisory Committee, chaired by Ian Walmsley
- a Technical Advisory Group, chaired by Kashefi

As of November 2025 the leadership team included Cuthbert as Director, Kashefi as Chief Scientist, Simon Plant as Deputy Director for Innovation, Anne-Claire Blet as Deputy Director for Programme Delivery and Jonathan Burnett as Deputy Director for Research.

== Assessments ==
Reporting on the opening, Sky News science and technology editor Tom Clarke noted that no prototype quantum computer was yet large or stable enough to be of much use. He placed the centre in a global race in which large technology companies and other states, led by China, were also investing heavily. He wrote that governments were betting on a technology that "promises much, but has so far delivered little".

A 2026 report by the Alan Turing Institute's Centre for Emerging Technology and Security described the NQCC as the UK's independent technical authority on quantum computing. It recommended that the centre build on its testbed programme to explore integration with high-performance computing. A 2026 briefing by the Parliamentary Office of Science and Technology described the NQCC as building national quantum computing infrastructure, with testbeds across several hardware approaches.

== See also ==
- UK National Quantum Technologies Programme
- Quantum computing
- Elham Kashefi
