= President's Medal of the IOP =

Award from Institute of Physics

President's Medal
- Awarded for: Meritorious services in various fields of endeavour which were of benefit to physics
- Sponsored by: Institute of Physics
- Reward: Medal
- First award: 1998
- Website: http://www.iop.org/about/awards/

The President's Medal of the IOP is awarded by the Institute of Physics (IOP), with a maximum of two per presidency. It was first established in 1997, and is for "meritorious services in various fields of endeavour which were of benefit to physics in general and the Institute in particular". It is presented personally by the president of the Institute.

== Medallists ==
The following persons have received this medal:

- 2022 Peter Knight
- 2020 Myriam Sarachik
- 2018 William George Stirling
- 2017 Jocelyn Bell Burnell
- 2016 John Dudley
- 2014 Douglas Paul
- 2012 Brian Cox
- 2009 Mazlan Othman
- 2008 Michael Atiyah
- 2006 Timothy Berners-Lee
- 2004 Edouard Brézin
- 2002 Martin Wood
- 2000 Jerome Isaac Friedman
- 1998 Frederick Dainton, Baron Dainton

== See also ==
- Institute of Physics Awards
- List of physics awards
