= Douglas Paul =

British quantum physicist (born 1969)

Douglas J. Paul OBE FRSE FREng FInstP
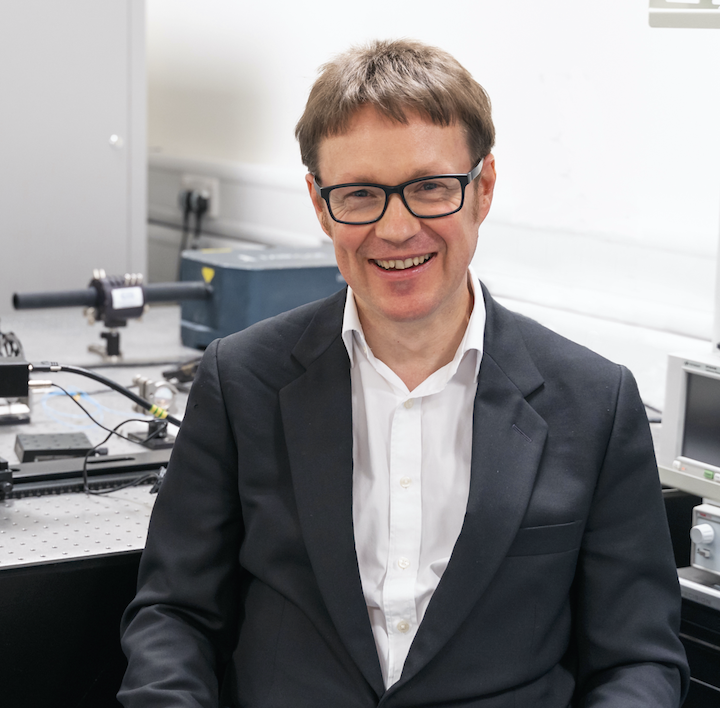
- Douglas Paul at the University of Glasgow
- Born: 1969 (age 56–57); Greenock Scotland UK
- Education: University of Cambridge, Cavendish Laboratory, Churchill College (BA, MA, PhD)
- Known for: quantum engineering, silicon-germanium, quantum sensor, single-photon avalanche diode, photonic integrated circuits, gravimeters
- Awards: President's Medal of the IOP (2014), Officer of the Order of the British Empire (2025).
- Scientific career
- Fields: Physicist, Engineering, Quantum Engineering
- Workplaces: University of Cambridge, Cavendish Laboratory, University of Glasgow
- Thesis: Single electronics using δ-doped silicon germanium (1993)
- Doctoral advisor: Haroon Ahmed
- Website: userweb.eng.gla.ac.uk/douglas.paul/index.html

Douglas J. Paul OBE FRSE FREng FInstP is a Scottish experimental physicist and electronic engineer who was appointed as an Officer of the Order of the British Empire in the 2025 New Year Honours List for services to quantum technology research. He is currently Professor of Semiconductor devices at the University of Glasgow holding a Royal Academy of Engineering Chair in Emerging technologies. His career has used microfabrication and nanofabrication to demonstrate semiconductor devices for a range of different applications.

== Education ==
Paul was born and brought up in Greenock attending Ardgowan Primary and Greenock Academy Schools. He studied natural sciences at Churchill College, University of Cambridge before gaining a PhD in physics at the Cavendish Laboratory for work which produced the first single-electron transistor in silicon-germanium. As an undergraduate at the University of Cambridge, he was sponsored by the DTI through the National Engineering Laboratory. He is a chartered physicist and a chartered engineer.

== Research and career ==
Paul first worked in the Semiconductor Physics Group led by Michael Pepper at the Cavendish Laboratory on mesoscopic silicon-germanium nanostructure physics At the same time he was awarded a research fellowship at St Edmund's College, Cambridge and became the Wine Steward for the College. His first funded research grant as principal investigator was an EC Framework IV project "Silicon Quantum Integrated Circuits (SiQUIC)" in 1997 on heterostructure and strained silicon MOSFETs and silicon-germanium resonant-tunneling diodes before he was awarded an EPSRC Advanced Research Fellowship in 1998. In 1998 he became a Class A Fellow at St Edmund's College, Cambridge.

Paul started work on SiGe terahertz radiation sources first with DARPA funding in 2000 which delivered the first SiGe terahertz LEDs before additional support from EC and EPSRC grants. At the same time he published work on 2D metal-insulator transitions in MOSFETs, received funding on quantum information processing using defects in MOSFETs with Michael Pepper and Crispin Barnes and worked with Alan Fowler at IBM to help de-risk the introduction of high-κ dielectric into the IBM Microelectronics CMOS process.

In 2007, Paul moved to the Department of Electrical and Electronic Engineering at the University of Glasgow where he set up the "Semiconductor Devices Group".. He became the first Director of the "James Watt Nanofabrication Centre". in 2010. His research from 2009 included energy harvesting, thermoelectrics and thermal photovoltaics and he led an EC Strategic Research Agenda on Sustainable ICT in 2016.

In 2013 he started work on photonic integrated circuits for miniaturising atomic systems and his group microfabricated the first Ge on Si single photon avalanche diode (SPAD) photodetector for operation in the short wave infrared before demonstrating the first Ge on Si planar single photon avalanche diode. He also worked with Leroy Cronin and used silicon nanowires with polyoxometalate molecules to demonstrate molecular flash memory.

Paul working with Giles Hammond demonstrated the first MEMS gravimeter. The EC project Newton-g has four of the Glasgow MEMS gravimeters on Mount Etna in Italy trying to image magma movements inside the volcano to see if they can be used to predict when the volcano might erupt.

From 2014 Paul was on the management boards of the UK Quantum Technology Hub for Quantum Enhanced Imaging (QuantiC) and the UK Quantum Technology Hub for Sensors and Metrology as part of the UK National Quantum Technologies Programme. He continued in these Hubs in Phase 2 and also joined the EPSRC Quantum Communications Hub. Since 2023 he has been leading an EPSRC Programme Grant aiming to produce a chip-scale quantum navigator.

Paul frequently gives outreach lectures to the public on a number of topics including electronics, nanotechnology, sustainable energy and quantum engineering. He was the plenary speaker at the Glasgow Science Festival in 2019 giving the Royal Philosophical Society of Glasgow lecture on nanotechnology and quantum engineering.

In July 2024 it was announced that Paul is the principal investigator of the U.K. Hub for Quantum Enabled Position Navigation and Timing which started on 1 December 2024 as part of the phase III Hubs in the UK National Quantum Technologies Programme. He was awarded an Officer of the Order of the British Empire in the 2025 New Year Honours List for services to quantum technology research and became a Fellow of the Royal Academy of Engineering in September 2025.

He has also held a number of positions which relates to work aligned to his academic positions which include:-

- 1999 and 2000 - Editor with Laurens W. Molenkamp for the Technology Roadmap for European Nanoelectronics.
- 2003 Wrote the Picturing People - Non-Intrusive Imaging section of the Department of Trade and Industry (United Kingdom) Foresight review of Exploiting the Electromagnetic Spectrum
- 2004 Member of the Chemical, Biological and Physics Panel for the NATO Science for Peace and Security
- 2004 Member of the Home Office Chemical, Biological, Radiological and Nuclear Scientific Advisory Committee
- 2004 Institute of Physics Science Board
- 2011 Working Group for the Council for Industry and Higher Education on Enhanced Value: Getting the Most out of UK Research
- 2013 European Commission Zeropower Strategic Research Agenda
- 2016 European Commission Editor and author of the ICT Strategic Research Agenda on Sustainable ICT
- 2017 EPSRC Research Infrastructure Strategic Advisory Team
- 2021 Institution of Engineering and Technology Quantum Engineering Technical Network Executive Committee
- 2022 EPSRC ICT Strategic Advisory Team

== Honours and awards ==
- 1994 - Research Fellow at St Edmund's College, Cambridge
- 1998 - Fellow at St Edmund's College, Cambridge
- 2000 - EPSRC Advanced Research Fellowship
- 2007 - Elected Fellow of the Institute of Physics
- 2011 - Elected as a Fellow of the Royal Society of Edinburgh
- 2014 - President's Medal of the IOP – Institute of Physics
- 2015 - EPSRC Established Research Fellowship in Quantum Technologies
- 2020 - Royal Academy of Engineering Chair in Emerging technologies
- 2025 - Officer of the Order of the British Empire
- 2025 - Fellow of the Royal Academy of Engineering

== Books and Edited books ==
E. Kasper and D.J. Paul, "Silicon Quantum Integrated Circuits: Silicon-Germanium Heterostructure Devices: Basics and Realisations" Springer-Verlag, Berlin-Heidelberg (2005), Web: https://link.springer.com/book/10.1007/b137494

M. Perenzoni and D.J. Paul (Editors), "Physics and Applications of Terahertz Radiation" Springer Series in Optical Sciences 173 (2014) - Web: http://link.springer.com/book/10.1007/978-94-007-3837-9, ISBN 978-94-007-3836-2

G. Abadal Berini, G. Fagas, L. Gammaitoni and D.J. Paul (Editors), "A research agenda towards zero-power ICT" Intech Open Access from "ICT - Energy - Concepts Towards Zero - Power Information and Communication Technology" (2014) - https://doi.org/10.5772/57092

G. Fagas, J.P. Gallagher, L. Gammaitoni, D.J. Paul (Editors), "Energy Challenges for ICT" ICT-Energy Concepts for Energy Efficiency and Sustainability, INTECH (2017) - https://doi.org/10.5772/66678
