= Sabrina Maniscalco =

- Sabrina Maniscalco at Growth Summit in 2022
- Born: May 6, 1974 (age 52); Mazara del Vallo, Italy
- Citizenship: Italian
- Awards: Väisälä Prize (2017)

Academic background
- Education: University of Palermo (MS, PhD)

Academic work
- Discipline: Quantum physics, Quantum technology
- Institutions: University of Palermo; Heriot-Watt University; University of Turku; Aalto University; University of Helsinki
- Main interests: Quantum information, open quantum systems, quantum algorithms

Sabrina Maniscalco (born May 6, 1974, in Mazara del Vallo, Italy) is an Italian researcher specializing in quantum physics and quantum technology. She is the CEO of quantum technology company Algorithmiq.

Maniscalco earned her master's degree in 1999 and her PhD in 2004, both from the University of Palermo. From 2011 to 2014, she served as a professor at Heriot-Watt University in Scotland. She joined the quantum physics research group at the University of Turku after holding postdoctoral positions in Bulgaria and South Africa. Since 2014, Maniscalco has served as a professor of theoretical physics at the University of Turku, as well as an adjunct professor at Aalto University and a member of the Centre of Excellence in Quantum Technology.

In 2017, Maniscalco received the Väisälä Prize. She was elected a member of the Finnish Academy of Science and Letters in 2021.
