= Provost (education) =

Senior academic administrator

A provost is a senior academic administrator. At many institutions of higher education, the provost is the chief academic officer, a role that may be combined with being deputy to the chief executive officer. In some institutions, they may be the chief executive officer of a university, of a branch campus of a university, or of a college within a university.

== Chief academic officer ==
The specific duties and areas of responsibility for a provost as chief academic officer vary from one institution to another, but usually include supervision and oversight of curricular, instructional, and research affairs.

A section of Harvard's 1997 Re-accreditation Report for the New England Commission of Colleges and Schools described the provost:

The Provost at Harvard acts as an extension of the President. He is the second academic officer, after the President, having purview of the entire University. The Provost has special responsibility for fostering intellectual interactions across the University, including the five Interfaculty Initiatives (environment, ethics and the professions, schooling and children, mind/brain/behavior, and health policy). The Provost also acts to help improve the quality and efficiency of central services organized at Harvard under the aegis of the Vice Presidents.

Imperial College London, the first university in the UK to adopt a dual leadership model with a president and a provost, describes the role of the provost:

The Provost is the chief academic officer. Like the President, the Provost is a distinguished academic who upholds Imperial's very high standards for the core academic mission. He has direct responsibility for the major academic units (via the Faculty Deans) and the teaching and research mission via the Vice-Provosts (Education and Research and Innovation). The Provost also has responsibility for human – as well as intellectual – resources, with responsibility for promoting an inclusive and excellent staff and student community.

The various deans of a university's schools, colleges, or faculties typically report to the provost, or jointly to them and the institution's chief executive officer—which office may be called president, chancellor, vice-chancellor or rector. Likewise do the heads of the various interdisciplinary units and academic support functions (such as libraries, student services, the registrar, admissions, and information technology) usually report there. The provost, in turn, is responsible to the institution's chief executive officer and governing board or boards (variously called its trustees, the regents, the governors, or the corporation) for oversight of all educational affairs and activities, including research and academic personnel.

In many but not all North American institutions, the provost or equivalent is the second-ranking officer in the administrative hierarchy. Often the provost may serve as acting chief executive officer during a vacancy in that office or when the incumbent is absent from campus for prolonged periods. In these institutions, the title of provost is sometimes combined with those of senior vice president, executive vice president, executive vice chancellor, or the like, to denote that officer's high standing.

Provosts often receive staff support or delegate line responsibility for certain administrative functions to one or more subordinates variously called pro-provost, assistant provost, associate provost, vice provost, or deputy provost. The deputy provost is often the right-hand person of the provost who assumes the provost's responsibilities in the provost's absence.

Provosts are often chosen by a search committee made up of faculty members, and are almost always drawn from the 'tenured faculty' or 'professional administrators' with academic credentials, either at the institution or from other institutions.

== History ==
The title "provost" (Latin: praepositus) has been used in England from medieval times for the head of colleges such as Oriel College, Oxford and Eton College. More recent colleges have adopted the same usage, e.g. the principal of University College London was retitled as provost in 1906, and Durham University adopted the title for University College Stockton in 1999 (until it was split into two new colleges in 2001).

Following its usage for the heads of colleges, some multi-campus state university systems in the United States have used provost as the title of the head of a branch campus. For example, the chancellors of the Newark and Camden campuses of Rutgers University in New Jersey were formerly known as provosts. A similar practice arose in Britain in the early 21st century with the establishment of international branch campuses, many of which were headed by provosts.

The establishment of provosts as the chief academic officers of universities in the US began in the first half of the 20th century. The first use of the title in American higher education was in 1754 at the University (then the College) of Pennsylvania. The post was created under Benjamin Franklin as president of the board of trustees, and while Franklin was in this position he remained heavily involved in the college. However, on Franklin's retirement in 1755 the provost took up the more usual (at the time) role of head of the college, which it retained until the re-establishment of the presidency of the university in 1930. At Columbia University, the board of trustees established the office of provost in 1811 as a political compromise; it was abolished five years later when the holder departed. The Trustees and the president of the university re-established the office of provost in 1912 as the chief academic officer, who "would be associated with the President and the Secretary of the university in the consideration and oversight of matters of general university concern and in the preparation of general university business for consideration either by the Trustees, the University Council, or the appropriate Faculty." It fell vacant again between 1926 and 1937, but on its restoration was seen as the second officer in the administration, behind only the president.

Other American universities and colleges created provosts as heads of academic affairs during and after World War II, when dramatic increases in undergraduate enrollments (due to the G.I. Bill) and the increased complexity of higher education administration led many chief executive officers to adopt a more corporate governing structure. By the 1960s, many private research universities had provosts installed as their chief academic officers, including Brown (1949), Chicago (1963), Cornell (1931), Dartmouth (1955; in abeyance 1972–79), Duke (1960), Johns Hopkins (1924), MIT (1949), Princeton (1966), Rice (1954), Stanford (1952), Tufts (1951), Wake Forest (1967) and Yale (1919). Harvard was a notable holdout: a provost had been appointed in 1933, but only with authority over the Faculty of Arts and Sciences, and the position had been eliminated in 1953. It was not until 1995 that Harvard appointed a university-wide provost.

The use of provost as the title of the chief academic officer of a university (as opposed to its historic use for the head of a college) is relatively recent in the UK. One of the earliest was Imperial College London, where the first provost was appointed in 2012, splitting off the chief academic officer role previously carried out by the rector (chief executive) of the university after a governance review. The vice-chancellor (chief executive) of Durham University praised this arrangement in 2014, following a governance review that recommended it at that university, saying "The Vice-Chancellor's role in an international university like this now is something that cannot be done by one person with all the external and internal stuff you have to do. In America it's been the case all the time that they've had a president and a provost, with the president being the equivalent of Vice-Chancellor. This more or less splits the external and internal duties. Personally I believe that we should move to this model – Imperial [College] has done it, I believe the LSE [London School of Economics] is moving in that direction and a few others are as well. I think it's certainly what we must do to maintain our status as an international university." Durham expanded the post of deputy vice-chancellor (created 2011) to be the deputy vice-chancellor and provost when it next became vacant in 2016.

As of December 2022, most members of the Russell Group of research-intensive universities in the UK had appointed a senior officer with academic responsibility separate from their chief executive. Some of these used the title provost on its own, others used provost in combination with another title indicating that they were deputy to the chief executive officer), while both King's College London and Southampton eschewed the title provost in favour of Senior Vice-President (Academic) and Glasgow used Senior Vice Principal and Deputy Vice Chancellor (Academic). The London School of Economics appointed a provost and deputy director in 2013 but, after the holder left in 2015, no longer have the position in their management structure. However, only a few of the Russell Group universities with provosts (including Imperial, Durham, Edinburgh and Bristol) explicitly identified the provost as being the chief academic officer, and Exeter and Sheffield continued to explicitly identify the chief executive officer as the chief academic officer.

== Titles and other uses ==
At some North American research universities and liberal arts colleges, other titles may be used in place of or in combination with provost, such as chief academic officer or vice president for academic affairs (or, rarely, academic vice-president, academic vice rector, or vice president for education). At smaller independent liberal arts colleges, the chief academic officer may carry the title "dean of the college" or "dean of the faculty" in addition to or instead of provost. For example, at Trinity College in Hartford, Connecticut, the dean of the faculty is also the vice president for academic affairs and is the second-highest administrator, directly beneath the president.

In some universities, the chief administrative officer of a large academic division may be a provost. Finally, in some colleges and universities, the title of provost (and the function of deputy to the president or chancellor) may be separate from the function of chief academic officer.

Universities using provost in the title of their chief executive officer include University College London and Trinity College, Dublin. The title is also used for the heads of Oriel, Queen's and Worcester colleges in the University of Oxford; King's College, Cambridge; St Leonard's College, St Andrews; all residential colleges of the University of California, San Diego; and all residential colleges of the University of California, Santa Cruz. The Provost of Eton is the chair of the governors of Eton College.

Many universities also use provost as the title for the chief executive officers of their international branch campuses. Some of these universities also use provost (often in combination as "provost and deputy vice-chancellor" or similar) for their chief academic officer. Glasgow Caledonian New York College showed a mixture of this use in international branch campuses with the US system. The president of the college was the Glasgow-based Principal and Vice-Chancellor of Glasgow Caledonian University, while the New York-based Vice President and Provost was the senior official at the campus.

== See also ==
- List of academic ranks
- Dean (education)
- Principal (university)
- Professor
- Postgraduate education
- Undergraduate education
