= UK National Quantum Technologies Programme =

UK National Quantum Technologies Programme (UKNQTP)
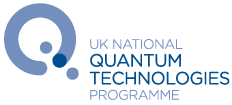
- Established: 2013
- Location: UK
- Website: uknqt.ukri.org

The UK National Quantum Technologies Programme (UKNQTP) is a programme set up by the UK government to translate academic work on quantum mechanics, and the effects of quantum superposition and quantum entanglement into new products and services. It brings UK physicists and engineers together with companies and entrepreneurs who have an interest in commercialising the technology.

== The "second quantum revolution" ==
The "second quantum revolution", or "quantum 2.0" is a term that is often used to describe quantum technologies based on superposition and entanglement. Originally described in a 1997 book by Gerard J. Milburn, which was then followed by a 2003 article by Jonathan P. Dowling and Gerard J. Milburn, as well as a 2003 article by David Deutsch. These technologies use equipment such as highly stabilised laser systems, magneto-optical traps, cryogenic cooled solid state devices, ion traps and vacuum systems to create, manipulate and then use quantum effects for a number of different purposes. These include: quantum information processing, such as quantum computing, quantum simulation, quantum secure communications, quantum sensing and metrology and quantum imaging, and are widely believed to offer capabilities that will out-perform existing and future classical technologies.

The programme has contributed to the vast number of quantum technologies start-ups within the UK. Examples include Orca Computing, Universal Quantum, Oxford Ionics, Delta g and Cerca Magnetics.

== History ==
In 2013, a group of key stakeholders were brought together by DSTL at Chicheley Hall. The UKNQTP was then initiated by a £270 million investment by the UK Chancellor of the exchequer, George Osborne in the Autumn Statement 2013. In addition to this, the UK Defence Science and Technology Laboratory (Dstl) separately announced a £30 million investment into a programme to produce demonstrator devices.

== Organisation and governance ==
The primary focus of the UKNQTP are five 'hubs' for quantum technologies:

- The UK Quantum Biomedical Sensing Research Hub (Q-BIOMED), led by University College London.
- UK Quantum Technology Hub in Sensing, Imaging and Timing (QuSIT), led by the University of Birmingham.
- Integrated Quantum Networks (IQN) Quantum Technology Research Hub, led by Heriot-Watt University.
- Hub for Quantum Computing via Integrated and Interconnected Implementations (QCI3), led by the University of Oxford.
- The UK Hub for Quantum Enabled Position, Navigation and Timing (QEPNT), led by the University of Glasgow.

Past hubs include:

- Quantum hub for Networked Quantum Information Technologies, led by the University of Oxford.
- Quantum Hub for sensors and metrology, led by the University of Birmingham
- Quantum Communications Hub, led by the University of York
- Quantum Computing & Simulation Hub led by the University of Oxford
- QuantIC: Quantum hub for quantum enhanced imaging, with a central team at the University of Glasgow

The UKQTP is advised by the Quantum Technologies Strategic Advisory Board, which is chaired by Professor David Delpy, it also consists of Professor Sir Peter Knight, Baroness Neville-Jones, Professor Gerald Milburn, Professor Ian Walmsley and other leading individuals from industry, academia and public sector.

The programme is delivered by several UK public bodies: UK government Department for Science, Innovation and Technology, EPSRC, STFC, Innovate UK, Dstl, NPL, GCHQ and Innovate UK Business Connect.

== Press coverage ==
The UKQTP has received some attention from the UK media, with an interview with Professor Miles Padgett on the BBC Radio 4 Today programme on 11 November 2015 and articles in New Scientist, and Nature materials

== Key milestones and achievements ==
- Summer 2013 - Dstl, after consultation with the academic community publish a UK Quantum Technologies Landscape document, which outlines a number of areas of research that are ready to become devices for defence and commercial use.
- December 2013 - The UK Chancellor George Osborne announces a £270 million investment into quantum technologies
- November 2014 - The Science Minister at the time, Greg Clark announces a "national network of quantum technology hubs"
- March 2015 - The Quantum Technologies Strategic Advisory Board release their strategy for the UKNQTP
- April 2015 - Innovate UK announces the results the competition 'exploring the commercial applications of quantum technologies', a £5 million funding round for companies working to develop quantum technologies.
- March 2016 – UK Government announce £37 million for Quantum Doctoral Training Partnerships
- November 2018 – Announcement of the National Quantum Computing Centre.
- July 2019 – UK Government commits a further £94 million to the National Quantum Technologies Programme, comprising the second round of four Quantum Technology Hubs.
- September 2019 – The £40 million Quantum Technologies for Fundamental Physics programme is announced
- March 2023 – UK Government announce 10-year National Quantum Strategy
- November 2023 – UK Government announce 5 Quantum Missions
- July 2024 – UK Government announces the third round of quantum technologies hubs which helps ensure the UK benefits from quantum future
- October 2024 – The National Quantum Computing Centre Facility based in Harwell opens
- March 2026 – UK Government announces support worth up to £2 billion to establish the UK as a world leader in Quantum, from skills and talent to research and procurement programmes.
