= Quantum Communications Hub =

- Established: January 6, 2015
- Research type: Research hub
- Field of research: Quantum information
- Director: Tim Spiller
- Website: www.quantumcommshub.net

The Quantum Communications Hub is a quantum technology research hub established as part of the UK National Quantum Technologies Programme. The hub is a consortium of 8 UK universities and 13 industrial partners, which received funding of £24m over a 5-year period.

The hub has established techniques for quantum key distribution (QKD), and in particular the chip-scale integration of QKD, as well as developed the UK's first quantum network.

== Organisation ==
The hub is led by the University of York and its academic partners are the University of Bristol, the University of Cambridge, Heriot-Watt University, the University of Leeds, Royal Holloway, University of London, the University of Sheffield and the University of Strathclyde.

The Quantum Communications Hub works with 13 industrial partners including Airbus, the European Telecommunication Standards Institute, ID Quantique, the UK National Physical Laboratory, and Toshiba.

== Independent coverage ==
Independent media have reported on experimental advances in UK quantum communications infrastructure associated with the Quantum Communications Hub, including long-distance demonstrations of quantum-secure data transmission over deployed optical fibre networks. This coverage references research activity led by Richard Penty at the University of Cambridge in the context of UK quantum network development, with further technical details documented in institutional reporting on the demonstration.
