= Gerard J. Milburn =

Australian physicist

Gerard Milburn
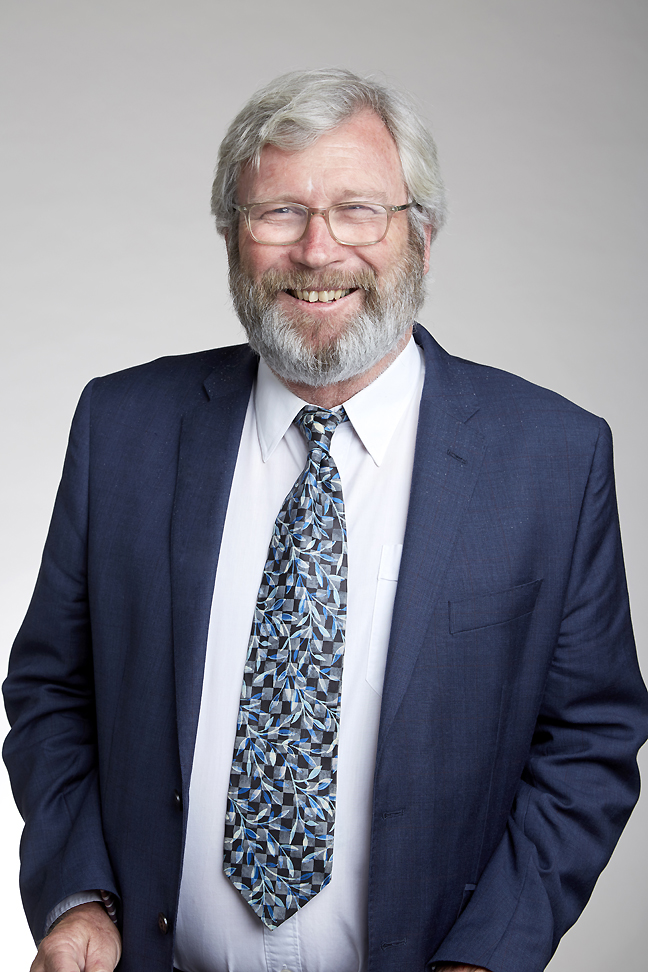
- Gerard Milburn at the Royal Society admissions day in London, July 2017
- Born: Gerard James Milburn; 1958 (age 67–68); Brisbane, Queensland, Australia
- Education: Griffith University; University of Waikato
- Known for: Quantum feedback; Quantum optics
- Scientific career
- Fields: Physicist
- Workplaces: University of Queensland; Australian National University; Imperial College London; University of Waikato
- Doctoral advisor: Daniel Frank Walls
- Doctoral students: Howard M. Wiseman
- Website: smp.uq.edu.au/node/106/19

Gerard James Milburn (born 1958) is an Australian theoretical quantum physicist notable for his work on quantum feedback control, quantum measurements, quantum information, open quantum systems, and Linear optical quantum computing (aka the Knill, Laflamme and Milburn scheme).

In 2024 he became the first Quantum Fellow of the UK's National Quantum Computing Centre.

== Education ==
Milburn received his BSc (Hons) in Physics from Griffith University in 1980. He completed his PhD in physics under Daniel Frank Walls at the University of Waikato in 1982, with a thesis entitled Squeezed States and Quantum Nondemolition Measurements.

== Career and Research ==
Following his PhD, Milburn did postdoctoral research in the Department of Mathematics at Imperial College London in 1983. Later, in 1984, he was awarded a Royal Society Fellowship to work in the Quantum Optics group of Peter Knight, at Imperial.

In 1985 he returned to Australia and was appointed lecturer at The Australian National University. In 1988 Milburn took up an appointment as Reader in Theoretical Physics at The University of Queensland. In 1994 he was appointed as Professor of Physics and in 1996 became Head of Department of Physics at The University of Queensland. From 2000 to 2010 he was Deputy Director of the Australian Research Council Centre of Excellence for Quantum Computer Technology. From 2003 to 2013 he was an Australian Research Council Federation Fellow at the University of Queensland.

He was the Chair of the Scientific Advisory Committee of the Institute for Quantum Computing and served on the scientific advisory committee for the Perimeter Institute for Theoretical Physics from 2007 to 2010.

From 2011 to 2017 he was the Director and Chief Investigator of the Australian Research Council Centre of Excellence for Engineered Quantum Systems.

In October 2024 he joined the National Quantum Computing Centre in the United Kingdom as its first Quantum Fellow.

=== Honors and awards ===
His awards include the Moyal Medal for Mathematical Physics (awarded 2001) and Boas medal, (awarded in 2003). He is a fellow of the Australian Academy of Science (1999), a Fellow of the American Physical Society (2005), and elected a Fellow of the Royal Society in 2017.
