= ORCA Computing =

British quantum computing company

- Type: Private
- Industry: Quantum computing
- Founded: 2019
- Founders: Ian Walmsley; Richard Murray; Josh Nunn
- Headquarters: London, United Kingdom
- Key people: Richard Murray (CEO)
- Products: PT Series photonic quantum computers
- Website: orcacomputing.com

ORCA Computing is a British company that develops photonic quantum computers. It was founded in 2019 as a spin-out from the University of Oxford and is based in London. Its PT Series machines use single photons to carry information. They operate at room temperature and are built largely from standard telecommunications components.

In 2022 the Ministry of Defence bought one of its machines, which was reported as the UK government's first quantum computer. ORCA has since supplied systems to the Poznań Supercomputing and Networking Center in Poland, Montana State University in the United States and the UK's National Quantum Computing Centre. Independent experts and journalists have described the machines as an early stage of the technology and have questioned some of the company's performance claims.

== History ==
=== Founding ===
ORCA was founded in 2019 by Oxford academics led by Ian Walmsley, whose photonics research is the basis of the company. Its co-founders were Walmsley, Richard Murray and Josh Nunn. The company is based on patents from NQIT, a quantum computing hub that Walmsley directed within the UK National Quantum Technologies Programme. It was incorporated on 28 October 2019.

Murray, the chief executive, had completed a doctorate in quantum technologies at the University of Southampton and worked for the technology consultancy TTP and for Innovate UK before setting up the company. Oxford Science Enterprises provided £1.5 million of pre-seed funding in late 2019. The French venture fund Quantonation was also an early investor.

In September 2021 the BBC reported on ORCA's first machine. It had four qubits, ran at room temperature and was housed in a standard server cabinet at the company's offices on a science park in west London. The company said it was one of the world's smallest quantum computers. John Morton of University College London told the BBC that photonics was "definitely not a fringe approach", but that the machine was at an earlier stage in qubit numbers than the superconducting systems of Google, Rigetti and IBM. The BBC added that scaling up was likely to be a major challenge. It also reported ORCA's first commercial deal, with BT and BP, to test whether one of its devices in a data centre could help produce more energy-efficient materials.

In November 2021 ORCA was chosen to lead a consortium, including BT and KETS, to design a "quantum data centre of the future". The Innovate UK project was valued at £11.6 million.

=== Ministry of Defence ===
In June 2022 the Ministry of Defence bought a PT-1, the UK government's first quantum computer. The Financial Times later described it as probably the first quantum computer bought by any defence ministry. The ministry hoped the machine would speed up the analysis of large sets of sensor data. The Defence Science and Technology Laboratory said its compact design, without cryogenic cooling, meant one could in future be used in a military vehicle. The machine had eight qubit-equivalents and was delivered in February 2023. Its price was not disclosed. Outside experts were cautious. They described the purchase as an investment in the technology's potential rather than its readiness, and said such machines could not yet solve practical problems.

In the same month as the Ministry of Defence purchase, ORCA raised US$15 million in a Series A round led by Octopus Ventures, with Oxford Science Enterprises, Quantonation and Verve Ventures. It then had a team of 30 in the UK, Canada, the United States and Poland.

=== Expansion ===
In 2023 ORCA worked with Nvidia on hybrid machine learning. A PT Series processor supplied the latent space for a generative adversarial network, while eight Nvidia graphics processors trained the neural networks. Tech Monitor noted that quantum computers powerful and reliable enough to help businesses were potentially decades away, and that hybrid systems offered a faster path.

Later in 2023 ORCA was chosen to install two PT-1 systems at the Poznań Supercomputing and Networking Center. They were procured through the Polish arm of the EuroHPC Joint Undertaking and were the centre's first quantum computers.

From late 2023 ORCA was a technology partner in the Quantum Technology Access Programme, run by Digital Catapult to help companies test possible uses of quantum computing. Participants, including Airbus and Rolls-Royce, were given access to ORCA's PT-1. Its third cohort, in 2026, was run with the National Quantum Computing Centre's SparQ programme, and ORCA remained its technical partner.

In January 2024 ORCA made its first acquisition in the United States, buying the integrated photonics division of GXC, based in Austin, Texas. The Evening Standard reported that ORCA had sold five quantum computers in the previous two years.

In February 2024 ORCA was one of the companies selected to build testbed quantum computers for the National Quantum Computing Centre at Harwell. ORCA said it delivered the system in June 2025. In June 2024 ORCA announced that Montana State University would install two PT-1 systems, funded by the United States Air Force.

ORCA's second-generation system, the PT-2, followed in 2024. Bloomberg included ORCA in its 2024 list of 25 UK start-ups to watch. In 2025 Vodafone began working with ORCA on using quantum technology to optimise telecommunications networks.

=== PT-3 ===
In July 2026 Wired reported a study by the Technical University of Denmark that combined a generative artificial intelligence model with an ORCA quantum computer to design peptides. When the peptides were made and tested in the laboratory, the hybrid model produced more successful candidates than its classical counterpart. Wired noted that quantum computers were still too small to run full-scale models, so better results could be achieved on a classical computer.

In October 2026 ORCA launched its third-generation system, the PT-3, at Digital Realty's Innovation Lab in London, where it runs alongside Nvidia graphics processors. The company called it the first quantum system built to deliver "commercial quantum advantage". Computer Weekly noted that its benchmarks were supplier-run and competitive with, rather than clearly better than, classical solvers. eWeek found that ORCA's headline speed-up of more than 12 times compared the PT-3 with its own predecessor rather than with a classical computer, and that earlier white-paper results for the PT-3 had been projections.

== Technology ==
ORCA's computers use single photons as qubits. Unlike the superconducting machines of rivals such as Google and IBM, they do not need to be cooled to near absolute zero, and they are mounted in standard racks. They use standard telecommunications components and optical fibre. The Times described the PT-1 as five briefcase-sized boxes on a rack. The PT-3 occupies two standard data-centre racks and draws about 6 kW.

The PT Series machines perform programmable boson sampling, in which photons interfere in an optical circuit and the output is sampled. A 2026 review in The Journal of Supercomputing describes how ORCA uses multiplexing and quantum memory to reduce the number of components needed. ORCA has said its platform was the first to include a quantum memory that allows photonic quantum computers to scale.

The machines are designed to work alongside conventional computers. Their software is written in Python and works with the PyTorch machine learning library. A 2026 report by the Alan Turing Institute's Centre for Emerging Technology and Security described ORCA's demonstration of a distributed quantum neural network in a hybrid system. It said ORCA was targeting quantum advantage for some artificial intelligence and optimisation tasks in 2027.

For future error-corrected machines, ORCA has proposed a measurement-based architecture that uses measurements in the GHZ basis. The review describes it as a resource-efficient route towards fault tolerance.

PT Series systems
System	First reported	Notes
PT-1	2022	Bought by the Ministry of Defence. Also supplied to the Poznań Supercomputing and Networking Center and Montana State University.
PT-2	2024	Used in the Technical University of Denmark peptide study.
PT-3	2026	Launched at Digital Realty's Innovation Lab in London.

== Corporate affairs ==
ORCA's registered office is in Paddington, London. The company was earlier based in Wood Lane, White City. Richard Murray is the chief executive. Josh Nunn has served as chief scientific officer. In October 2026 ORCA said it had installed 11 PT Series systems and was working with more than 35 customers and partners.

== See also ==
- Linear optical quantum computing
- List of companies involved in quantum computing, communication or sensing
