= Contemporary Physics =

- Volume Number: 51. Published By: Taylor & Francis
- Discipline: Physics
- Language: English
- Edited by: Peter Knight (scientist)

Publication details
- History: 1959–present
- Publisher: Taylor & Francis (United Kingdom)
- Frequency: Quarterly
- Impact factor: 5.185 (2020)

Standard abbreviations
- ISO 4: Contemp. Phys.

Indexing
- ISSN: 0010-7514 (print); 1366-5812 (web)

Links
- Journal homepage; Table of contents, Taylor & Francis Online

Contemporary Physics is a peer-reviewed scientific journal publishing introductory articles on important recent developments in physics. Editorial screening and peer review is carried out by members of the editorial board.

== Overview ==
Contemporary Physics has been published by Taylor & Francis since 1959 and publishes four issues per year. The subjects covered by this journal are: astrophysics, atomic and nuclear physics, chemical physics, computational physics, condensed matter physics, environmental physics, experimental physics, general physics, particle & high energy physics, plasma physics, space science, and theoretical physics.

== Aims ==
The journal publishes introductory review articles on a range of recent developments in physics and intends to be of particular use to undergraduates, teachers and lecturers, and those starting postgraduate studies. Contemporary Physics also contains a major section devoted to standard book reviews and essay reviews which review books in the context of the general aspects of a field which have a wide appeal.

== Abstracting and indexing ==
According to the Thomson Reuters Journal Citation Reports, the journal has a 2020 impact factor of 5.185. Contemporary Physics is abstracted and indexed in Inspec, EBSCO Publishing, Current Contents, Current Mathematical Publications, Mathematical Reviews, SciSearch, and SciBase.

== Notable authors ==
Contemporary Physics has attracted articles from a number of prominent scientists, including:

- Jim Al-Khalili, OBE
- Subrahmanyan Chandrasekhar, FRS
- Leon Cooper
- Otto Robert Frisch, FRS
- Vitaly Ginzburg, FRS
- Stephen Hawking, CBE, FRS
- Sir Peter Knight, FRS (current editor-in-chief)
- Sir Anthony James Leggett, KBE, FRS
- Sir Nevill Francis Mott, FRS
- Sir John Pendry, FRS FInstP
- Abdus Salam, KBE
- Arthur Leonard Schawlow
