= James Stirling (physicist) =

British particle physicist

James Stirling CBE FRS FInstP
- Born: 4 February 1953; Belfast
- Died: 9 November 2018 (aged 65)
- Education: Peterhouse, Cambridge University
- Awards: Smith's Prize (1978)
- Scientific career
- Workplaces: Durham University; CERN; Cambridge University; University of Washington
- Thesis: Deep Inelastic Processes in Asymptotically Free Theories (1979)
- Doctoral advisor: John Polkinghorne

William James Stirling CBE FRS FInstP (4 February 1953 – 9 November 2018) was a physicist who served as the first Provost of Imperial College London. He was appointed to this role in August 2013 and retired in August 2018.

== Biography ==
He was born in Belfast and grew up in Glengormley, County Antrim, attending first Glengormley Primary School and then Belfast Royal Academy. He was admitted to Peterhouse, Cambridge 1972 as an undergraduate, taking a First in Part IB and Part II of the Mathematical Tripos and a Distinction in Part III. He graduated with a BA in 1975, and continued at Peterhouse to take a PhD (1979) in Theoretical Particle Physics in the Department of Applied Mathematics and Theoretical Physics. He won a Smith's Prize for Mathematics in 1978.

After periods of research in the US, Cambridge and the European Organization for Nuclear Research (CERN) in Geneva, Stirling was appointed to a lectureship at Durham University in 1986. In 2000 he became the first Director of the University's new Institute for Particle Physics Phenomenology (IPPP), which together with the Institute for Computational Cosmology, forms part of the Ogden Centre for Fundamental Physics, and before moving to Cambridge was Pro-Vice Chancellor (Research) from 2005 to 2008. At Cambridge he was the Jacksonian Professor of Natural Philosophy, Head of the Cavendish Laboratory, and Fellow of Peterhouse at the University of Cambridge.

From 2001 to 2003, he served as the first Chair of the Particle Physics and Astronomy Research Council Science Committee, the research council's top-level scientific advisory committee. He was a member of the Physics Sub-Panel in two Research Assessment Exercises (2001 and 2008) and was Deputy Chair of the 2008 panel.

Stirling's research area was theoretical particle physics. In a research career spanning more than 30 years, he published more than 300 research papers, including some of the most frequently cited papers in the physical sciences. His particular research interest was particle physics phenomenology – the interface between theory and experiment – and he worked closely with experimentalists at research laboratories in Europe and the United States. He was a member of the internationally renowned MSTW collaboration that studies the 'parton' structure of the proton.

In recognition of his contribution to particle physics research, Stirling was elected to the Fellowship of the Royal Society in May 1999. He was appointed a CBE in the 2006 New Year Honours list, for services to science. He was a member of the Council of the Royal Society in 2007-8, and from 2009 served on the Council of the Science and Technology Facilities Council (STFC).

The Stirling Lecture, an annual public lecture hosted by the IPPP in Durham since 2008, is named in his honour.

Academic offices
Preceded by Malcolm Longair	Jacksonian Professor of Natural Philosophy; 2008–2013	Vacant Title next held by Didier Queloz
New office	Provost of Imperial College London; 2013–2018	Succeeded by Ian Walmsley
