= Howard M. Wiseman =

Australian physicist

Howard Wiseman
- Born: 19 June 1968 (age 58); Brisbane, Queensland, Australia
- Education: University of Queensland
- Known for: Quantum feedback; Quantum steering; Many interacting worlds interpretation
- Awards: Pawsey Medal (2003); Malcolm McIntosh Prize (2003); Walter Boas Medal (2021)
- Scientific career
- Fields: Physicist
- Workplaces: Griffith University; University of Queensland; University of Auckland
- Doctoral advisor: Gerard J. Milburn
- Other academic advisors: Dan Walls

Howard Mark Wiseman (born 19 June 1968) is an Australian theoretical and quantum physicist, who is notable for his work on quantum feedback control, quantum measurements, quantum information (especially quantum steering), open quantum systems, the many interacting worlds interpretation of quantum mechanics, and other topics in quantum foundations.

== Early life ==
Wiseman was born in Brisbane, Australia and received his B.Sc.(Hons) in Physics from the University of Queensland in 1991. He completed his PhD in physics under Gerard J. Milburn at the University of Queensland in 1994, with a thesis entitled Quantum Trajectories and Feedback.

== Career ==
After his PhD, Wiseman undertook a postdoc under Dan Walls at the University of Auckland. From 1996 to 2009 he held Australian Research Council (ARC) research fellowships. He is currently a Physics Professor at Griffith University, where he is the Director of the Centre for Quantum Dynamics. He is also an Executive Node Manager in the Centre for Quantum Computation and Communication Technology, an ARC Centre of Excellence.

== Honors ==
His early-career awards include the Bragg Medal of the Australian Institute of Physics (AIP), the Pawsey Medal of the Australian Academy of Science and the Malcolm Macintosh Medal, one of the Prime Minister's Prizes for Science. He is a fellow of the Australian Academy of Science, a Fellow of the American Physical Society, and a Fellow of The Optical Society of America. In 2022 Wiseman was awarded the AIP's Walter Boas Medal for Excellence in Research, for elucidating fundamental limits arising from quantum theory, in particular in its applications to metrology and laser science, and via its implications for the foundations of reality.

== See also ==
- Quantum Aspects of Life (book)

== Selected bibliography ==
- Wiseman, Howard M.; Milburn, Gerard J. (2009). Quantum Measurement and Control. Cambridge; New York: Cambridge University Press. pp. 460. ISBN 978-0-521-80442-4.
