= List of presidents of the Institute of Physics =

The President of the Institute of Physics is the head of the governing Council of the Institute of Physics. The history of the Institute, from its founding as the Physical Society of London in 1874 through to today's Institute has meant that the name of the post held has varied. The current President is former UKNNL CEO Paul Howarth.

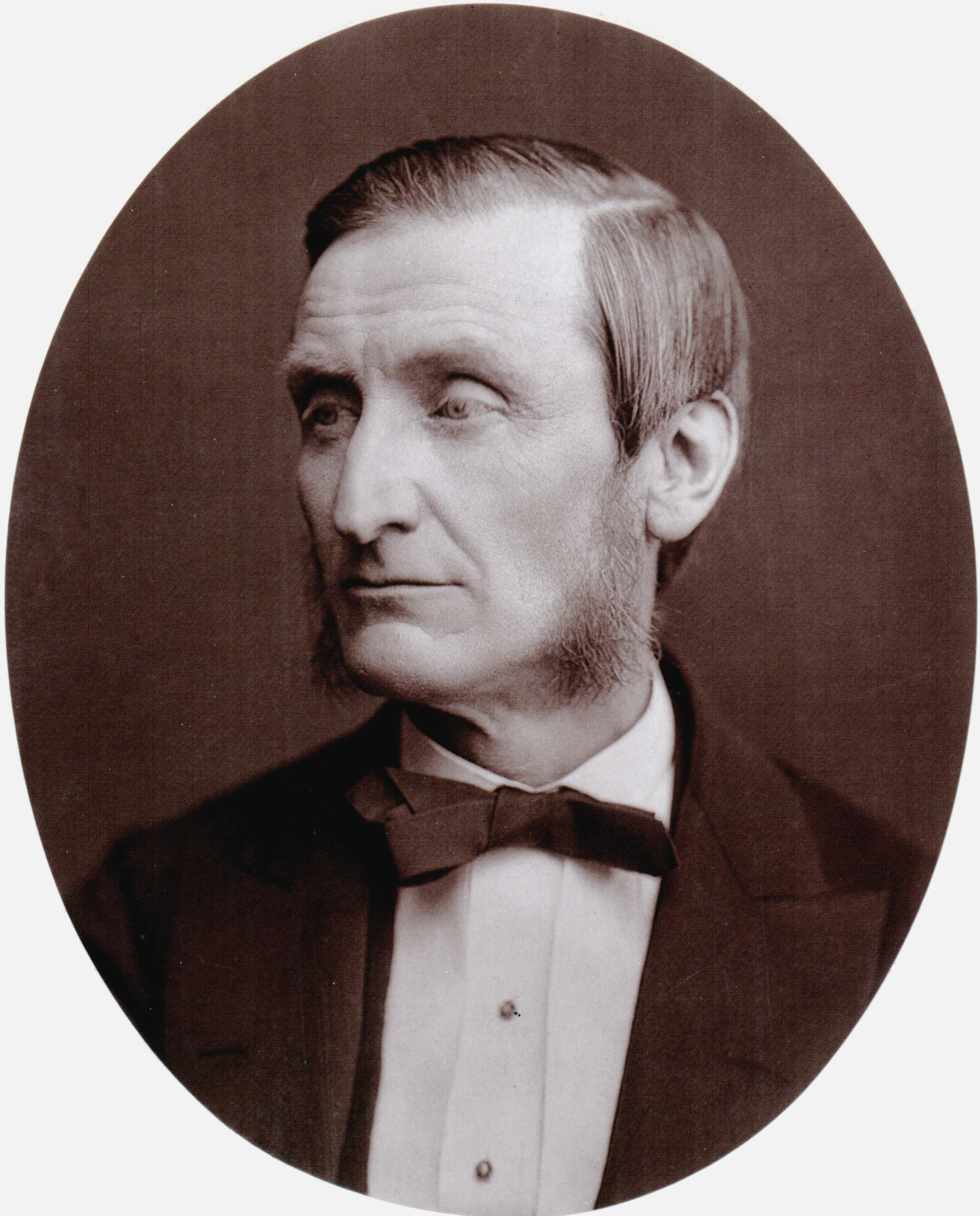
John Hall Gladstone, the first President of the Physical Society of London.

== Presidents of the Physical Society of London ==
- 1874–1876 John H Gladstone
- 1876–1878 George C Foster
- 1878–1880 William G Adams
- 1880–1882 The Lord Kelvin of Largs
- 1882–1884 Robert B Clifton
- 1884–1886 Frederick Guthrie
- 1886–1888 Balfour Stewart
- 1888–1890 Arnold W Reinold
- 1890–1892 William E Ayrton
- 1892–1893 George F FitzGerald
- 1893–1895 Arthur W Rucker
- 1895–1897 William de W Abney
- 1897–1899 Shelford Bidwell
- 1899–1901 Oliver J Lodge
- 1901–1903 Silvanus P Thompson
- 1903–1905 Richard T Glazebrook
- 1905–1906 John H Poynting
- 1906–1908 John Perry
- 1908–1910 Charles Chree
- 1910–1912 Hugh Longbourne Callendar
- 1912–1914 Arthur Schuster
- 1914–1916 Sir Joseph J. Thomson
- 1916–1918 Charles V Boys
- 1918–1920 Charles Herbert Lees

== Presidents of the Physical Society ==
- 1920–1922 Sir William Bragg
- 1922–1924 Alexander Russell
- 1924–1926 F E Smith
- 1926–1928 O W Richardson
- 1928–1930 W H Eccles
- 1930–1932 Sir Arthur Eddington
- 1932–1934 A O Rankine
- 1934–1936 Lord Rayleigh
- 1936–1938 Thomas Smith
- 1938–1941 Sir Allan Ferguson
- 1941–1943 Sir Charles Darwin
- 1943–1945 E N de Costa Andrade
- 1945–1947 D Brunt
- 1947–1949 G I Finch
- 1949–1950 S Chapman
- 1950–1952 L F Bates
- 1952–1954 R Whiddington
- 1954–1956 H S W Massey
- 1956–1958 N F Mott
- 1958–1960 J A Ratcliffe

== Presidents of the Institute of Physics ==
- 1919–1921 Sir Richard T Glazebrook
- 1921–1923 Sir Joseph Thomson
- 1923–1925 Sir Charles Parsons
- 1925–1927 Sir William Bragg
- 1927–1929 Sir Frank Dyson
- 1929–1931 William H Eccles
- 1931–1933 The Lord Rutherford of Nelson
- 1933–1935 Sir Henry Lyons
- 1935–1937 Alfred Fowler
- 1937–1939 Clifford C Paterson
- 1939–1943 Sir Lawrence Bragg
- 1943–1946 Sir Frank Smith
- 1946–1948 Arthur M Tyndall
- 1948–1950 Francis C Toy
- 1950–1952 William E Curtis
- 1952–1954 Charles Sykes
- 1954–1956 Sir John Cockroft
- 1956–1958 Oliver W Humphreys
- 1958–1960 Sir George Thomson

== Presidents of the Institute of Physics and the Physical Society ==
- 1960–1962 Sir John Cockroft
- 1962–1964 Sir Alan Herries Wilson
- 1964–1966 Sir Gordon Sutherland
- 1966–1968 Sir James Taylor
- 1968–1970 Malcolm Gavin

== Presidents of the Institute of Physics ==
- 1970–1972 James W Menter
- 1972–1974 Sir Brian Flowers
- 1974–1976 Sir Brian Pippard
- 1976–1978 Basil J Mason
- 1978–1980 Rendel S Pease
- 1980–1982 Sir Denys Wilkinson
- 1982–1984 Sir Robert Clayton
- 1984–1986 Sir Alec Merrison
- 1986–1988 Godfrey H Stafford
- 1988–1990 Cyril Hilsum
- 1990–1992 Roger Blin-Stoyle
- 1992–1994 Clive A. P. Foxell
- 1994–1996 Sir Arnold Wolfendale
- 1996–1998 Brian Manley
- 1998–2000 Sir Gareth Roberts
- 2000–2002 Sir Peter Williams
- 2002–2004 Sir David Wallace
- 2004–2006 Sir John Enderby
- 2006–2008 Peter Saraga
- 2008–2010 Dame Jocelyn Bell Burnell
- 2010–2011 Marshall Stoneham
- 2011–2011 Dame Jocelyn Bell Burnell (Interim)
- 2011–2013 Sir Peter Knight
- 2013–2015 Frances Saunders
- 2015–2017 Roy Sambles
- 2017–2019 Dame Julia Higgins
- 2019–2021 Jonathan Flint
- 2021–2023 Sheila Rowan
- 2023–2025 Keith Burnett
- 2025–2026 Michele Dougherty
- 2026–present Paul Howarth
