= Quantum steering =

Property of states in quantum mechanics

In physics, in the area of quantum information theory and quantum computation, quantum steering is a special kind of nonlocal correlation, which is intermediate between Bell nonlocality and quantum entanglement. A state exhibiting Bell nonlocality must also exhibit quantum steering, a state exhibiting quantum steering must also exhibit quantum entanglement. But for mixed quantum states, there exist examples which lie between these different quantum correlation sets. The notion was initially proposed by Erwin Schrödinger, and later made popular by Howard M. Wiseman, S. J. Jones, and A. C. Doherty.

== Definition ==
In the usual formulation of quantum steering, two distant parties, Alice and Bob, are considered, they share an unknown quantum state $\rho$ with induced states $\rho_A$ and $\rho_B$ for Alice and Bob respectively. Alice and Bob can both perform local measurements on their own subsystems, for instance, Alice and Bob measure $x$ and $y$ and obtain the outcome $a$ and $b$. After running the experiment many times, they will obtain measurement statistics $p(a,b|x,y)$, this is just the symmetric scenario for nonlocal correlation. Quantum steering introduces some asymmetry between two parties, viz., Bob's measurement devices are trusted, he knows what measurement his device carried out, and thus can perform a tomographically complete measurement. Meanwhile, Alice's devices are untrusted, she doesn't know what she measures but can still record each choice of measurement and outcome. Bob's goal is to determine if Alice influences his states in a quantum mechanical way or just using some of her prior knowledge of his partial states and some classical means. The classical way for Alice to influence Bob's states is known as the scenario having a local hidden state model which is, in some sense, a generalisation of the local hidden variable model for Bell nonlocality and also a restriction of the separable state model for quantum entanglement.

Mathematically, consider Alice having some finite number of measurements $\{M^x\}$ indexed by $x$, where for each $x$, we have that $M^x=\{M^x_1,M^x_2,\ldots,M^x_n\}$ is a POVM with outcomes $\{1,2,\ldots,n\}$, or $a$ in general. The assemblage between Alice and Bob is then a set of unnormalised quantum states on Bob's side indexed by the measurement choices and outcomes of Alice:

$$\mathcal{S}=\{p(a|x)\rho_{a|x}\}_{a,x}$$,

where $p(a|x):=\mathrm{Tr}(\rho_{AB} M^x_a \otimes I_B)=\mathrm{Tr}(\rho_A M^x_a)$ and $\rho_{a|x}:=\mathrm{Tr}_A(\rho_{AB} M^x_a \otimes I_B)/p(a|x)$, this latter trace denoting a partial trace over Alice's system.

An unsteerable assemblage is one that can be described by a so-called local hidden state model: a probability distribution $p(\lambda)$ over an exogenous variable $\lambda$, together with a set of quantum states $\{\sigma_\lambda\}$ on Bob's side and a probability distribution $p(a|x,\lambda)$ on Alice's side. We say that an assemblage is unsteerable if for all elements of the assemblage:

$$p(a|x)\rho_{a|x}=\sum_{\lambda} p(\lambda) p(a|x,\lambda) \sigma_\lambda$$.

If an assemblage is not unsteerable it is called steerable. A state is called unsteerable (steerable) if there exists measurements such that an unsteerable (steerable) assemblage can be created from it.

== Local hidden state model ==
Let us do some comparison among Bell nonlocality, quantum steering, and quantum entanglement. By definition, a Bell nonlocal which does not admit a local hidden variable model for some measurement setting, a quantum steering state is a state which does not admit a local hidden state model for some measurement assemblage and state assemblage, and quantum entangled state is a state which is not separable. They share a great similarity.

- local hidden variable model $p(a,b|x,y)=\sum_{\lambda}p(a|x,\lambda)p(b|y,\lambda)p(\lambda)$
- local hidden state model $p(a,b|x,y)=\sum_{\lambda}p(a|x,\lambda)\mathrm{Tr}(F_{b|y}\sigma_{\lambda})p(\lambda)$
- separable state model $p(a,b|x,y)=\sum_{\lambda}\mathrm{Tr}(E_{a|x}\chi_{\lambda})\mathrm{Tr}(F_{b|y}\sigma_{\lambda})p(\lambda)$
