= Myriam Sarachik =

Belgian-American physicist (1933–2021)

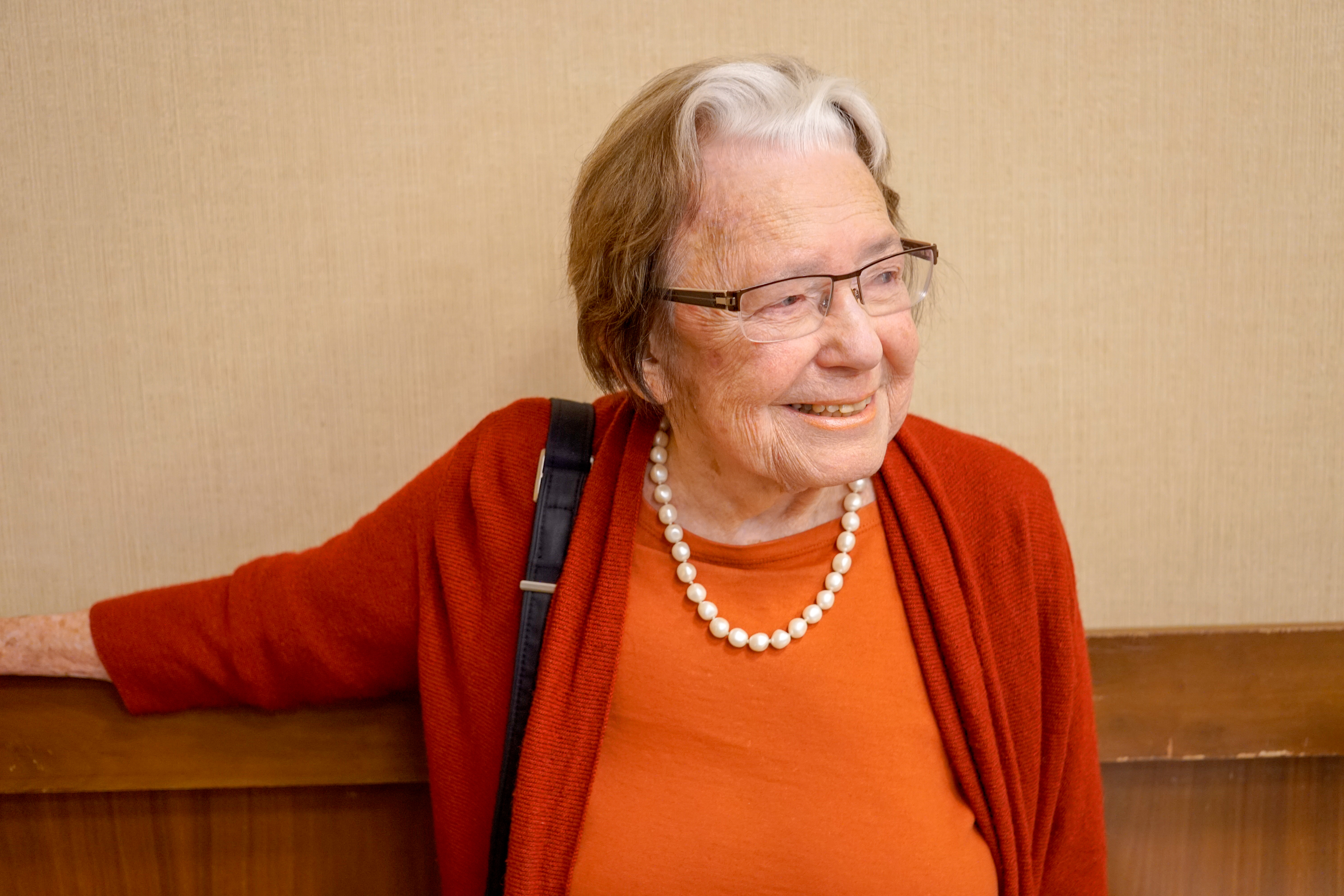
- Sarachik in 2019
- Born: Myriam Paula Morgenstein; August 8, 1933; Antwerp, Belgium
- Died: October 7, 2021 (aged 88); Manhattan, New York, U.S.
- Education: Barnard College (BA); Columbia University (MS, PhD)
- Awards: L'Oreal-UNESCO Award (2005); Oliver E. Buckley Prize (2005); APS Medal (2020); National Medal of Science (2023)
- Scientific career
- Fields: Physics
- Workplaces: City College of New York
- Thesis: Penetration of magnetic fields through superconducting lead films (1960)
- Doctoral advisor: Richard Garwin

Myriam Paula Sarachik (August 8, 1933 – October 7, 2021) was a Belgian-born American experimental physicist who specialized in low-temperature solid state physics. From 1996, she was a distinguished professor of physics at the City College of New York. She is known for the first experimental confirmation of the Kondo effect in the 1960s.

== Early life and education ==
Myriam Sarachik was born Myriam Paula Morgenstein on August 8, 1933, in Antwerp, Belgium. Her parents, Sarah (Segal) and Schloimo Morgenstein, were Orthodox Jews who were born in Poland. Her mother moved to Belgium as a child and her father moved in his mid-teens. Her parents met and married in Belgium. Her father worked as a diamond cutter and diamond dealer. Myriam had two siblings, an older brother Paul and a younger brother Henry. The primary language spoken at home was Yiddish.

The family fled Belgium in 1940 due to the German occupation of Belgium during World War II. At first they fled to Calais, France, but by the time they arrived it had already been invaded by Germany, so the family returned to Antwerp. In the process her older brother Paul became separated and was transported on a British ship for women and children from Dunkirk to England. In 1941, after a year in Antwerp the family decided to try to escape the German occupation again. They took a train to Paris and then with fake papers attempted to cross the border into Spain. While attempting to cross the border, the family was apprehended and interned in Merignac, a concentration camp near Bordeaux. They were then transferred to Camp de la Lande near Tours. The family escaped the same year and were smuggled across the border between German-occupied France and Vichy France.

After spending a few weeks in Nice, the family took a train across the Pyrenees Mountains into Spain and stayed in Bilbao before sailing from Vigo to Cuba. Sarachik spent the next five and a half years in Cuba as a refugee, where she attended school and learned Spanish and English. In 1947, Sarachik and her family were granted visas to enter the United States and they moved to New York City.

She graduated from the Bronx High School of Science in 1950 and began studying at Barnard College the same year. Sarachik was awarded a B.A. in 1954. She received her M.S. at Columbia University in 1957, and her Ph.D. at Columbia University in 1960, where her advisor was Richard Garwin. Her Ph.D. research was on measuring the attenuation of a magnetic field by Type-I superconducting films. Her doctoral work provided an important experimental test for BCS theory by showing how the magnetic field penetration depth in superconducting lead depended on temperature. This led Sarachik to be able to deduce a value of the superconducting energy gap which agreed with the directly measured value She published results from her doctoral research in Physical Review Letters and the IBM Journal of Research and Development the same year as she received her doctorate.

== Academic career ==
From 1962 to 1964 she held a postdoctoral appointment at the Bell Telephone Laboratories. At Bell Laboratories she demonstrated that magnetic impurities in a non-magnetic metal, which form local magnetic moments, can cause the electrical resistance of the alloy to increase at low temperatures. As the temperature lowers, the resistance for most metallic materials will continue to decrease until it reaches a plateau. However, some anomalous metallic materials will have a minimum resistance after which the resistance will increase even as the temperature is lowered. Sarachik showed that there was a one-to-one correspondence between the presence of local magnetic moments and the minimum of the resistance in metallic materials. Her experiments provided the first data that confirmed the Kondo effect.

Despite advice from mentors that becoming a housewife or part-time teacher might suit her better, Sarachik joined the physics department of the City College of New York as an assistant professor in 1964. Three years later, in 1967, she was elevated to associate professor. In 1971, she became a full professor. In 1996, City College honored her by naming her as distinguished professor of physics.

Sarachik's work was primarily in the field of low temperature condensed matter physics, in which she focused on molecular nanomagnets and novel phenomena in dilute two-dimensional electron systems. Some of her research sought to understand the metal-insulator transition, or the conditions under which an insulator can become a conductor. Experiments of this type must be performed near absolute zero. Sarachik also researched the transport and magnetic properties of semiconductors and quantum tunnelling.

In 2020, Sarachik was awarded the American Physical Society (APS) Medal for Exceptional Achievement in Research for her "contributions to the physics of electronic transport in solids and molecular magnetism". She was president of APS in 2003, and was awarded the Oliver E. Buckley Condensed Matter Physics Prize in 2005. In 2008, she was elected to the governing council of the National Academy of Sciences.

She was active in defending the human rights of scientists as a member and chair of the Committee on the International Freedom of Scientists of the APS, a long-time member of the Human Rights of Scientists Committee of the New York Academy of Sciences, and a board member of the Committee of Concerned Scientists.

== Honors and awards ==
Sarachik received the following honors:

- Member, National Academy of Sciences (elected 1994)
- Member, American Academy of Arts and Sciences (elected 1999)
- Fellow, American Physical Society
- Fellow, New York Academy of Sciences
- Fellow, American Association for the Advancement of Science
- Recipient, 1995 NYC Mayor's Award for Excellence in Mathematical, Physical, and Engineering Sciences
- Recipient, 2004 Sloan Public Service Award from the Fund for the City of New York
- Recipient, 2005 L'Oréal/UNESCO For Women in Science Laureate for North America
- Recipient, 2005 APS Oliver E. Buckley Prize in Condensed Matter Prize along with David Awschalom and Gabriel Aeppli.
- Recipient, 2006 Honorary Doctor of Science degree from Amherst College
- Recipient, 2020 APS Medal for Exceptional Achievement in Research
- Recipient, 2020 President's Medal of the IOP
- Recipient, 2023 National Medal of Science

== Personal life ==
In 1954, Myriam married Philip Sarachik, a professor of electrical engineering at New York University. They had two children, Karen and Leah. In 1970, five-year-old Leah was kidnapped by Sarachik's housekeeper using the family car. The housekeeper's body was found 12 days later and Leah's body was found a month after that.

Sarachik died on October 7, 2021, in Manhattan at the age of 88.
