= NQIT =

- Established: January 28, 2015
- Research type: Research hub
- Field of research: Quantum information
- Director: Ian Walmsley
- Website: nqit.ox.ac.uk

NQIT (Networked Quantum Information Technologies) is a quantum computing research hub established in 2014 as part of the UK National Quantum Technologies Programme. NQIT is a consortium of 9 UK universities and 30 partners, which received funding of £38m over a 5-year period.

By the end of the 5-year programme NQIT aims to produce the Q20:20 engine, a demonstration of a scalable quantum computer demonstrator comprising an optically linked network of 20 cells, each cell being a quantum processor with 20 matter qubits.

== Organisation ==
The UK National Quantum Technologies Programme was initiated by the UK Chancellor of the Exchequer, George Osborne in the Autumn Statement in 2013 in which he pledged a £270 million investment. A £120 million national network of four Quantum Technology Hubs was announced by Greg Clark in 2014. The NQIT Hub is led by a Director, Professor Ian Walmsley, who provides overall leadership and scientific vision, and two co-directors, Professor Dominic O’Brien, who leads the Systems Engineering, and Dr Tim Cook, who leads the Industrial User Engagement activities.

NQIT is led by the University of Oxford and academic partners are the University of Bath, the University of Cambridge, the University of Edinburgh, the University of Leeds, the University of Southampton, the University of Strathclyde, the University of Sussex and the University of Warwick.

Within the University of Oxford, NQIT works across the Departments of Physics, Engineering, Computer Science and Materials.

NQIT works with 30 industrial and government partners, including Aspen Electronics, the Centre for Quantum Technologies, Covesion Ltd, the Defence Science and Technology Laboratory, Element Six, ETSI, the Fraunhofer Institute for Telecommunications, Google, Lockheed Martin, M Squared Lasers, the UK National Physical Laboratory, Oxford Capital, Oxford Instruments, Pure Lifi, Raytheon UK, Rohde & Schwarz, Satellite Applications Catapult and Toshiba.

== Q20:20 ==
NQIT's principal goal is to implement the Q20:20 engine: a hybrid matter/optical quantum computer involving twenty optically linked nodes, where each node is a small quantum processor of twenty qubits. Each processing node will be an ion trap, within which a small number of ions are held suspended in a vacuum and manipulated by laser and microwave systems. Each qubit is implemented within the internal hyperfine states of each ion, and control of the qubits is achieved optically via integrated lasers and through microwave manipulation. Quantum interlinks between the traps will be realized by single photon emissions, which are combined and measured by optical fibres, splitters, switches and detectors.
