= Oxford Quantum Circuits =

British quantum computing company

- Type: Privately held company
- Industry: Quantum computing
- Founded: June 2017
- Founder: Peter Leek
- Headquarters: Reading, England
- Key people: Gerald Mullally (CEO); Peter Leek (CSO)
- Products: Superconducting quantum computers; quantum computing as a service
- Number of employees: About 120 (2024)
- Website: oqc.tech

Oxford Quantum Circuits (OQC) is a British company that develops superconducting quantum computers. It was founded in 2017 by the physicist Peter Leek as a spin-out from the Department of Physics at the University of Oxford. It is based in Reading.

OQC sells access to its machines as a service and places them in partner data centres. It has installed systems in Reading, Tokyo and New York City. In June 2026 it raised £260 million in a Series C round, which Sifted and The Times described as the largest private funding round for a European quantum computing company.

== History ==
=== Founding ===
Leek's research group at Oxford began work on superconducting quantum circuits in 2012. In 2017 the group described the coaxmon, a qubit design in which the qubit and its readout circuit sit on opposite sides of a chip and the wiring runs perpendicular to it. OQC was founded in June 2017 to commercialise the group's research. It was the university's first quantum computing spin-out. In December 2017 it raised about £2 million in seed funding from investors including Oxford Science Enterprises, Oxford Investment Consultants and the Parkwalk Opportunities Fund.

Ilana Wisby joined as the company's first chief executive in 2018. She was recruited through Oxford Science Enterprises. Leek continued to advise the company alongside his university research.

=== Quantum computing as a service ===
During the COVID-19 lockdowns OQC received a £4 million loan from the government's Future Fund, which helped it secure laboratory space at an incubator in Reading. By 2021 it had moved its work out of university laboratories into its own commercial laboratory, with cryogenic equipment and cleanrooms. In July 2021 it launched a cloud-based quantum computing service, offering access to its first system, Sophia, through a private cloud. It was the first UK company to offer access to its quantum hardware over the cloud. The Times later described it as Europe's first quantum computing as a service company.

Sophia had four qubits, far fewer than the 65 qubits of IBM's Hummingbird processor. ZDNet noted that quantum computers were not expected to be useful in practice until they reached at least 1,000 qubits. The consultant Olivier Ezratty criticised the launch for not being accompanied by a scientific paper on the hardware. Cambridge Quantum, its first customer, planned to test the system with its IronBridge cybersecurity platform. OQC also worked with the software company Riverlane on Deltaflow. OS, an operating system intended to let the same software run on different quantum hardware.

In November 2021 OQC signed a memorandum of understanding with the National Quantum Computing Centre. In February 2022 its eight-qubit Lucy processor, named after the physicist Lucy Mensing, became available on the Amazon Braket service from Amazon Web Services. It was the first Braket processor located in Europe.

In July 2022 OQC raised £38 million in the first close of a Series A round. The round was co-led by Lansdowne Partners and University of Tokyo Edge Capital Partners, with British Patient Capital, Oxford Science Enterprises and Oxford Investment Consultants also taking part. It was then the largest first funding round raised by a UK quantum computing company. OQC had about 60 employees at the time and planned to use the funds partly to set up a team in Japan.

According to Wisby, a power cut at OQC's Reading laboratory during Storm Arwen in late 2021, shortly before the launch on Amazon Braket, led the company to move its machines into commercial data centres. In September 2022 OQC announced the installation of a system in a Cyxtera data centre near Reading. The two companies described it as the first quantum computer in a colocation data centre. In March 2023 OQC announced a further installation at an Equinix data centre in Tokyo.

By August 2023 OQC had 96 employees, up from 60 a year earlier, and had opened offices in Tokyo and Spain. Its clients included Fujitsu, McLaren and Wells Fargo. In November 2023 it announced Toshiko, a 32-qubit platform for commercial data centres, and a $100 million Series B round led by SBI Investment. The round was still open, and OQC told UKTN it expected to close it in early 2024. Toshiko systems were deployed in London and Tokyo.

By September 2024 OQC had about 120 employees and three systems running in a commercial data centre outside Reading. The Sunday Times reported that the company was using them for work including timetabling for the Department for Transport and natural disaster modelling for Moody's.

=== Leadership changes ===
Wisby stepped down as chief executive in May 2024. Gerald Mullally, who had worked in the Prime Minister's Office and the Cabinet Office from 2014 before joining OQC in 2022, became interim chief executive. He was confirmed in the role in July 2025. In July 2024 Leek was appointed chief scientific officer, dividing his time between the company and the university. Jeremy Fleming, a former director of GCHQ, joined the board in May 2025. Colin Bell, a former chief executive of HSBC Bank plc and HSBC Europe, was appointed to the board in August 2025, followed in September by Nigel Higgins, the chairman of Barclays. BusinessCloud linked the appointments to the company's focus on financial services.

=== Error correction and New York ===
In 2025 OQC and Riverlane began a project, funded by Innovate UK, to build a quantum error correction testbed inside a commercial data centre. Riverlane's error-correction technology was to run first on a digital twin, a software model of OQC's system, before being integrated with the hardware. The three OQC machines in the Reading data centre, by then run by CenterSquare, were available to the data centre's customers. In June 2025 OQC published a roadmap targeting 200 logical qubits by 2028 and 50,000 by 2034. Its planned systems are named Titan, Athena and Atlas.

In September 2025 OQC installed its Genesis system at a Digital Realty data centre in Manhattan, paired with Nvidia hardware. Bloomberg reported it as the first quantum computer in New York City. The Times reported that the installation was presented as an export success in that week's British and American technology partnership announcements, and that it was intended for use by Wall Street banks, including for fraud detection.

=== Series C and expansion ===
In June 2026 OQC raised £260 million ($350 million) in a Series C round led by Bullhound Capital. The British Business Bank committed £100 million, the bank's largest direct investment in a single company to that point. Other investors included Fynveur, Cofides, Alpha Edison and Fulcrum Asset Management, and the venture arm of Chevron returned as an investor. Mergermarket reported that the round valued OQC at about $1 billion and that JPMorgan acted as placement agent.

In the same month OQC announced a research collaboration with JPMorgan Chase and AMD on a combined quantum and AI computing platform in London, with JPMorgan Chase as its first dedicated user. OQC also announced a €92 million development and manufacturing centre in Barcelona, with work due to begin in the fourth quarter of 2026. The centre is expected to create about 200 jobs. The Spanish development finance company Cofides contributed €46 million to the Series C round as part of the project. OQC had earlier sold a system for installation at CESGA, a Spanish supercomputing centre.

In November 2026 the pension provider Scottish Widows announced that OQC was expected to be among the first investments of its new fund for UK growth businesses. No financial details were disclosed. The fund is managed by Aberdeen Investments, with IP Group managing its UK venture portfolio. The Times reported that it was among the first UK pension schemes to invest savers' money directly in early-stage science and technology companies.

== Technology ==
OQC's processors use superconducting transmon qubits, the approach also taken by IBM and Google. Its core design, the coaxmon, places each qubit and its readout resonator on opposite sides of a sapphire chip. Control and readout signals arrive through coaxial wiring perpendicular to the chip, rather than through wiring routed across its surface. The design aims to avoid the wiring congestion that grows as two-dimensional chips add qubits. A 2022 study by Leek's group reported high coherence and low crosstalk in a version designed to tile into larger arrays.

OQC has also developed the dimon, a variant that encodes one qubit across two modes of a single device. This dual-rail encoding allows energy-loss errors to be detected when they occur. OQC researchers described it in a 2025 preprint. In 2026 the company reported a package holding more than 500 qubits on a single 3-inch wafer.

System	Introduced	Qubits	Notes
Sophia	2021	4	First system, offered through a private cloud.
Lucy	2022	8	Available on Amazon Braket.
Toshiko	2023	32	Deployed in data centres in London and Tokyo.
Genesis	2025	16 logical, as reported by the Financial Times	Installed in New York.

== Finances ==
OQC is privately held. In August 2023 The Times reported that it had raised nearly £50 million and had not yet made a profit. Its accounts for the year to 30 June 2025 showed revenue of £339,000, down from £4.7 million the year before, with 99.7 per cent coming from one customer. The operating loss was £22.6 million. The auditors noted a material uncertainty over the company's ability to continue as a going concern, which TechMarketView said the Series C round resolved. OQC's chief executive said the round gave the company enough capital to deliver its next-generation Titan system, expected in 2028.

== See also ==
- List of quantum processors
- National Quantum Computing Centre
