= John Dudley (physicist) =

New Zealand researcher

John M. Dudley
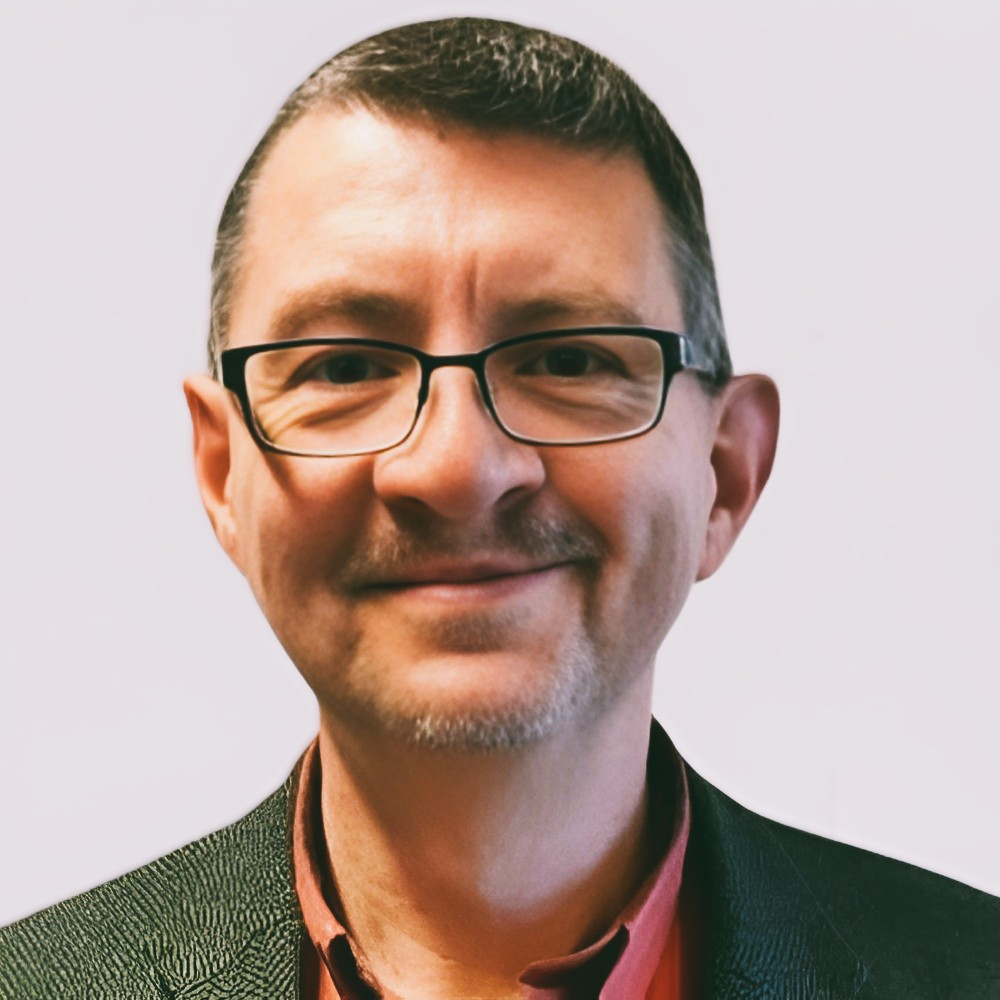
- Born: John Michael Dudley; New Zealand
- Education: University of Auckland
- Awards: EPS-QEOD Prize for Research into the Science of Light (2024); OSA R. W. Wood Prize (2020); SPIE Harold E. Edgerton Award (2019); APS Dwight Nicholson Medal (2017); IOP President's Medal (2016); OSA Hopkins Leadership Award (2015); SPIE President's Award (2014)
- Scientific career
- Fields: Physics; Nonlinear fiber optics; Ultrafast photonics; Extreme events
- Website: members.femto-st.fr/john-dudley/en

John Michael Dudley is a physicist and currently Professor of Physics at the Université Marie et Louis Pasteur working at the joint University-CNRS research Institute FEMTO-ST in Besançon, France. Originally from New Zealand, he is known for his research in nonlinear and ultrafast optical physics, for service to international scientific societies, and for initiatives in promoting international scientific outreach and the public communication of science.

== Biography ==
After attending high school at De La Salle College in Mangere, South Auckland, Dudley obtained B.Sc. and Ph.D. degrees from the University of Auckland in 1987 and 1992 respectively. His doctoral thesis was titled Coherent transient phenomena in the mode-locked argon laser. In 1992 and 1993, he carried out postdoctoral research at the University of St Andrews in Scotland before taking a lecturing position in 1994 at the University of Auckland. In 2000, he was appointed Professor at the University of Franche-Comté in Besançon. In 2009 he initiated the United Nations International Year of Light and Light-based Technologies 2015. He served as Steering Committee Chair of the International Year of Light 2015 until its successful completion and oversaw the delivery of its Final Report in 2016. In 2012, he was elected to the executive board of the European Physical Society, and he served as its president from April 2013 until April 2015. In 2017, he chaired the international partnership that worked with UNESCO to see the proclamation of the annual International Day of Light commemoration, and he continues to chair the International Day of Light Steering Committee.

== Research and professional interests ==
Dudley's research has included topics in ultrafast optics, supercontinuum generation and the science of rogue waves. His research has been supported from diverse sources including the French National Research Agency and the European Research Council. In the field of optical physics, he is particularly recognized for his contributions in ultrafast optical pulse metrology, nonlinear fiber optics, the study of nonlinear localized soliton structures, and especially broadband fiber supercontinuum generation. Dudley has published extensively in peer-reviewed journals with his work receiving over 30000 Google Scholar citations and a Google Scholar (Hirsch) h-index of 85. While at the University of Auckland in New Zealand, he also played a key role in the conservation and dissemination of the Sir Douglas Robb Lectures that were delivered by Richard Feynman in 1979, and which led to the publication of the popular science book QED: The Strange Theory of Light and Matter

== Awards and distinctions ==
Dudley was nominated to the French research body the Institut Universitaire de France in 2005 and elected a Fellow of the Optical Society of America (FOSA) in 2007. He was an IEEE LEOS Distinguished Lecturer for the period 2008-2010 and is past Chair of the Quantum Electronics and Optics Division of the European Physical Society. In 2009, he was awarded the Grand Prix de l'Electronique Général Ferrié from the Société des Electriciens et Electroniciens (SEE) and has also received a research award from the IXCORE Foundation. He was elected as a Fellow of the IEEE (FIEEE) in 2011, a Fellow of the European Optical Society (FEOS) in 2012, and a Fellow of the Institute of Physics (FInstP) in 2018. He is also a recipient of the CNRS Silver Medal in 2013, the SPIE President's Award in 2014, the Hopkins Leadership Award of the OSA in 2015, the Institute of Physics (IOP) President's Medal in 2016, the American Physical Society Dwight Nicholson Medal for Outreach in 2017, and the SPIE Harold E. Edgerton Award for High-Speed Optics in 2019. In 2019, Dudley was elected an honorary Fellow of the Royal Society of New Zealand. In 2020, he was awarded the R. W. Wood Prize of The Optical Society (OSA) which recognizes an outstanding discovery, scientific or technical achievement, or invention in the field of optics. In 2024, he was joint recipient of the European Physical Society Quantum Electronics and Optics Division Prize for Research into the Science of Light, which recognizes scientific excellence in the area of electromagnetic science in its broadest sense. In 2024, he was appointed to a five year term as Senior Fundamental Research Chair at the Institut Universitaire de France. Dudley was also awarded an honorary doctorate of science by the University of Bath in 2015.
