= National Quantum Coordination Office =

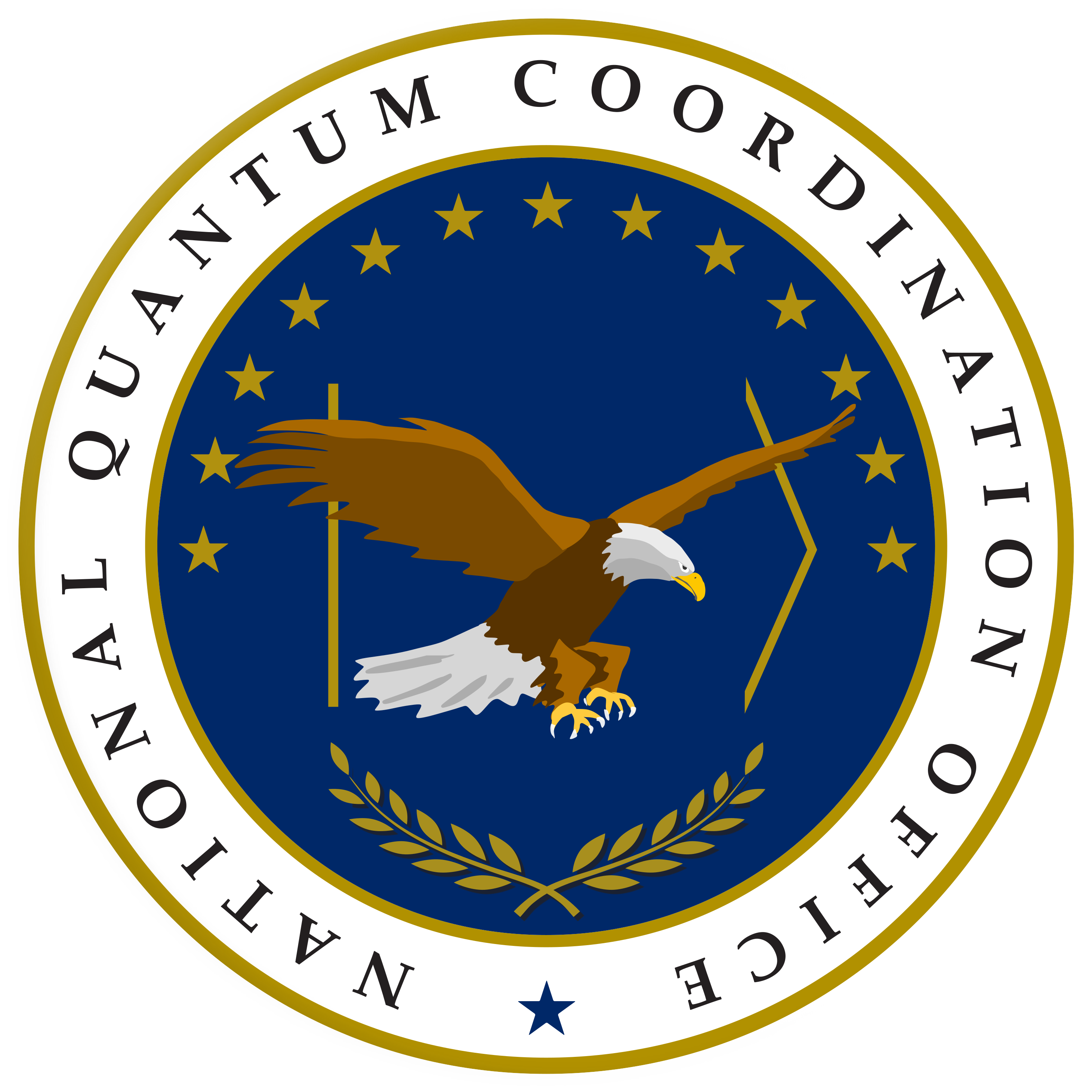
- Logo

Agency overview
- Formed: Established: December 21, 2018
- Jurisdiction: United States
- Headquarters: Washington, DC, U.S.
- Agency executive: Dr. Charles Tahan, Assistant Director for QIS at OSTP, and Director of the NQCO
- Website: www.quantum.gov

In the United States the National Quantum Coordination Office (NQCO) is located in the White House Office of Science and Technology Policy (OSTP). It is legislated by the National Quantum Initiative Act to carry out the daily activities needed for coordinating and supporting the National Quantum Initiative.

== Publications ==
- National Quantum Initiative Supplement To The President's FY 2021 Budget, 01/14/2021
- NQCO Publication Library
