= Provost of Imperial College London =

Academic official at Imperial College London

The Provost of Imperial College London is the second highest academic official at Imperial College London. The post is currently held by Ian Walmsley, who has held the post since 2018, following on from the original title holder James Stirling.

== List of Provosts ==
- 2013 James Stirling
- 2018 Ian Walmsley
