= National Quantum Initiative Act =

2018 United States law funding quantum computing and technology research

- Long title: An Act to provide for a coordinated Federal program to accelerate quantum research and development for the economic and national security of the United States.
- Enacted by: the 115th United States Congress
- Effective: December 21, 2018

Citations
- Public law: Pub. L. 115–368 (text) (PDF)

Legislative history
- Introduced in the House as H.R. 6227 by Lamar Smith (R-TX) on Jun 26, 2018; Committee consideration by Science, Space and Technology (House) and Commerce, Science and Transportation (Senate); Passed the House on September 13, 2018 (8229-8234); Passed the Senate on December 13, 2018 (); Signed into law by President Donald Trump on December 21, 2018

The National Quantum Initiative Act is an Act of Congress passed on December 13, 2018, and signed into law on December 21, 2018. The law gives the United States a plan for advancing quantum technology, particularly quantum computing.

== Act ==
The act was passed unanimously by the United States Senate and was signed into law by President Donald Trump. The National Quantum Initiative (NQI) provides an umbrella under which a number of government agencies develop and operate programs related to improving the climate for quantum science and technology in the US, coordinated by the National Quantum Coordination Office. These agencies include the National Institute of Standards and Technology (NIST), the National Science Foundation (NSF), and the United States Department of Energy (DOE). Under the authority of the NQI, the NSF and the DOE have established new research centers and institutes, and NIST has established the Quantum Economic Development Consortium (QED-C), a consortium of industrial, academic, and governmental entities.

== Related actions ==
=== Quantum Sandbox for Near-Term Applications Act ===
In May 2025, U.S. lawmakers introduced the bipartisan Quantum Sandbox for Near-Term Applications Act (S.1344), aiming to amend the National Quantum Initiative Act. The proposed legislation sought to establish a public-private partnership to accelerate the development of near-term quantum applications by creating testbeds, referred to as "quantum sandboxes", for innovators to test quantum technologies in real-world environments. The initiative focused on applications that can be developed and deployed within 24 months, with emphasis on sectors such as manufacturing, energy, and healthcare.

=== Texas Quantum Initiative ===
In May 2025, the Texas House of Representatives passed House Bill 4751, establishing the Texas Quantum Initiative. The legislation aims to position Texas as a national leader in quantum technology by funding quantum research and development. The bill went into effect on September 1, 2025.

=== Executive orders ===
In June 2026, President Trump signed two executive orders directing a whole-of-government effort to accelerate domestic quantum computing development and to speed the federal government's transition to post-quantum cryptography.
