= Journal of Modern Optics =

- Discipline: Optics, quantum optics
- Language: English
- Edited by: Kedar Khare

Publication details
- Former name: Optica Acta: International Journal of Optics
- History: 1954–present
- Publisher: Taylor & Francis
- Frequency: 21/year
- Impact factor: 0.9 (2025)

Standard abbreviations
- ISO 4: J. Mod. Opt.
- MathSciNet: J. Modern Opt.

Indexing
- CODEN: JMOPEW
- ISSN: 0950-0340 (print); 1362-3044 (web)
- LCCN: 87656599
- OCLC no.: 15722504

Links
- Journal homepage; Online access; Online archive

The Journal of Modern Optics is a peer-reviewed scientific journal that was established as Optica Acta in 1954. It obtained its current name in 1987 and is published by Taylor & Francis with 21 issues per year. The journal covers most branches of classical and quantum optics including lasers, diffraction, holographs, nonlinear optics, and photon statistics. Its current editor-in-chief is Kedar Khare (IIT Delhi).

== Abstracting and indexing ==
The journal is abstracted and indexed in:

- Current Contents/Engineering, Computing & Technology
- Current Contents/Physical, Chemical & Earth Sciences
- EBSCO databases
- Ei Compendex
- Inspec
- Science Citation Index Expanded
- Scopus
- zbMATH

According to the Journal Citation Reports, the journal has a 2025 impact factor of 0.9.
