= Stefan Scheel =

German physicist

Stefan Scheel (March 31, 1971) is a professor of physics, and former director of Institute of Physics at University of Rostock. He is currently the head of the "quantum optics of macroscopic systems" group at the University of Rostock.

== Life and work ==
Scheel was born in Leipzig on March 31, 1971. He studied physics at University of Leipzig and Imperial College London, and received his PhD from the Friedrich Schiller University of Jena in 2001, on macroscopic quantum electrodynamics. Since 2001 he worked as a lecturer in the Quantum Optics and Laser Science Group at the Department of Physics of Imperial College London, before joining University of Rostock.

=== Awards ===
- 2002: Feodor-Lynen Fellowship by the Alexander von Humboldt Foundation
- 2004: Advanced Research Fellowship, from UK Engineering and Physical Sciences Research Council

== Publications ==
- Neef, Vera; Pinske, Julien; Klauck, Friederike; Teuber, Lucas; Kremer, Mark; Ehrhardt, Max; Heinrich, Matthias; Scheel, Stefan; Szameit, Alexander (2023). "Three-dimensional non-Abelian quantum holonomy". Nature Physics. 19 (1): 30–34. Bibcode:2023NatPh..19...30N. doi:10.1038/s41567-022-01807-5.
