= Elham Kashefi =

Computer scientist and quantum computing researcher

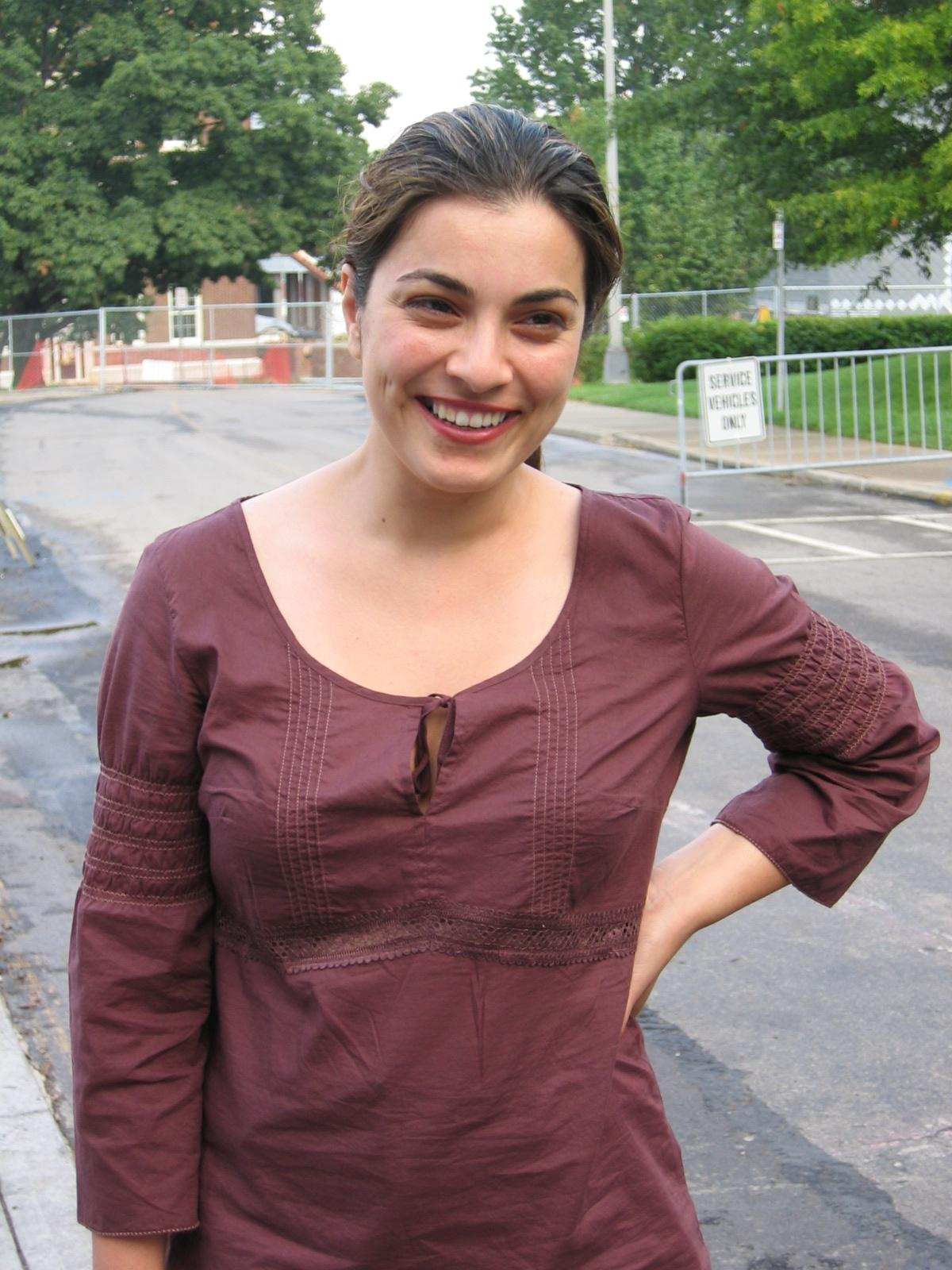
- Kashefi in 2003
- Education: Aboureihan High School
- Alma mater: Sharif University of Technology (BSc, MSc); Imperial College London (PhD)
- Scientific career
- Fields: Quantum cloud Quantum cryptography
- Workplaces: University of Edinburgh; University of Oxford; Sorbonne University
- Thesis: Complexity Analysis and Semantics for Quantum Computation (2003)
- Doctoral advisor: Vlatko Vedral; Steffen van Bakel
- Website: www.inf.ed.ac.uk/people/staff/Elham_Kashefi.html

Elham Kashefi (Persian: الهام کاشفی) is a Professor of Computer Science and Personal Chair in quantum computing at the School of Informatics at the University of Edinburgh, and a Centre national de la recherche scientifique (CNRS) researcher at the Sorbonne University. She is known as one of the inventors of blind quantum computing. Her work has included contributions to quantum cryptography, verification of quantum computing, and cloud quantum computing.

== Early life and education ==
Kashefi went to school at the Aboureihan High School in Tehran. She studied applied mathematics at Sharif University of Technology earning her bachelor's degree at Sharif University of Technology in 1996 and her master's degree in 1998. Kashefi was a doctoral student at Imperial College London, and completed her PhD in 2003 supervised by Vlatko Vedral and Steffen van Bakel.

== Career and research ==
After completing her PhD Kashefi was selected as a Junior Research Fellow at Christ Church, Oxford. Here she worked on the foundational structures of quantum computation. She was a research fellow at the Institute for Quantum Computing during 2005, before moving to Massachusetts Institute of Technology as a visiting scientist. Here she worked on depth complexity and parallel computing. Kashefi was appointed a lecturer at the University of Edinburgh in 2007. She holds an established career fellowship in quantum computing from the Engineering and Physical Sciences Research Council (EPSRC), a Personal Chair at the University of Edinburgh, and is a Centre national de la recherche scientifique (CNRS) researcher at the Sorbonne University.

Much of her research considers quantum cryptography and verification of quantum protocols. Her research looks to validate and verify quantum technologies, from computers to simulators to gadgets. Notably she was one of the originators of Universal Blind Computing which was the first protocol to permit privacy protection during general quantum computations. She believes that to achieve secure communications in a data-dependent society will require a combination of classical cryptography and quantum cryptography.

Kashefi has also contributed to the development of quantum cloud computing. In 2017 she co-founded VeriQloud, a software provider for quantum networks. Working with members of the quantum computing community, Kashefi co-founded the national quantum networks QUantum OXford Imperial College (QuOxIC) and Quantum Information Scotland Network (QUISCO). These hubs combine physicists and computer scientists to work together on quantum science.

In Nov 2022 Kashefi was appointed Chief Scientist at the UK National Quantum Computing Centre (NQCC). In April 2023 Kashefi was appointed director of the NQCC's Quantum Software Lab, based at the University of Edinburgh.

== Awards and honours ==
In 2024 Kashefi was elected a Fellow of the Royal Society of Edinburgh (FRSE). She had previously been elected to the Young Academy of Scotland in 2011.

== Selected publications ==
Her publications include;

- Universal blind quantum computation
- Demonstration of Blind Quantum Computing
- The measurement calculus
