= Ian Walmsley =

British physicist

Ian Walmsley CBE FRS FInstP
- Born: 13 January 1960 (age 66)
- Education: Imperial College London (BSc); University of Rochester (MSc, PhD)
- Spouse: Katharine Pardee
- Awards: Young Medal and Prize (2011)
- Scientific career
- Fields: Quantum physics
- Workplaces: University of Oxford; Imperial College London
- Doctoral advisor: Michael Raymer

Ian Alexander Walmsley CBE FRS (born 1960) is Provost of Imperial College London where he is also Chair of Experimental Physics. He was previously pro-vice-chancellor for research and Hooke Professor of Experimental Physics at the University of Oxford, and a professorial fellow at St Hugh's College, Oxford. He is also director of the NQIT (Networked Quantum Information Technologies) hub within the UK National Quantum Technology Programme, which is led by the University of Oxford. He is also a Fellow of the Institute of Physics, the American Physical Society and the Optical Society of America. He will return to Oxford from October 2025 as Director of the Oxford Quantum Institute.

Walmsley was educated at Imperial College London, and The Institute of Optics, University of Rochester. He received the Joseph F. Keithley Award For Advances in Measurement Science in 2011 and was elected a fellow of the Royal Society in 2012 for his contributions to quantum optics and ultrafast optics, including his development of the spectral phase interferometry for direct electric-field reconstruction (SPIDER) technique.

In March 2018 it was announced that Walmsley had been appointed provost of Imperial College London, succeeding James Stirling on 1 September 2018.

In October 2019, Walmsley co-founded Orca Computing, to undertake Quantum Computing in Optical Fibre through the use of quantum memory.
