= Peter Knight (physicist) =

British physicist

Peter Knight FRS HonFInstP
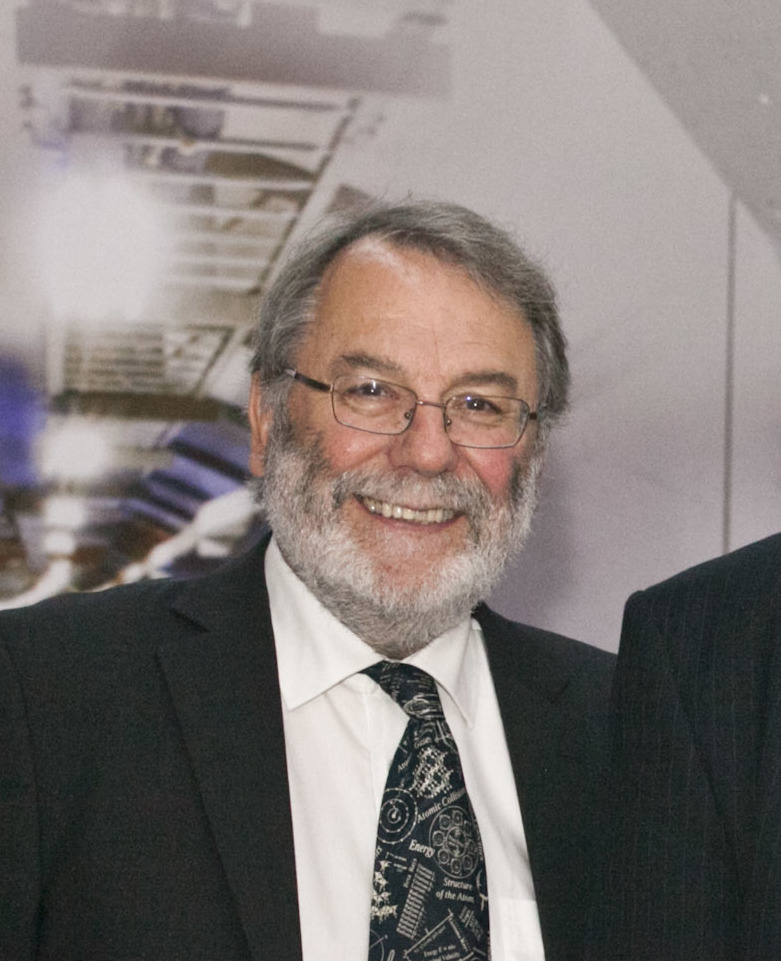
- Born: 12 August 1947 (age 79); Bedford, Bedfordshire, England, UK
- Citizenship: British
- Education: Bedford Modern School
- Alma mater: Sussex University
- Awards: Young Medal and Prize (1999); IET Faraday Medal (2019)
- Scientific career
- Fields: Physics
- Workplaces: Imperial College London; Royal Holloway, University of London
- Doctoral advisor: Les Allen
- Website: www.imperial.ac.uk/people/p.knight

Sir Peter Leonard Knight FRS HonFInstP (born 12 August 1947) is a British physicist, professor of quantum optics and senior research investigator at Imperial College London, and principal of the Kavli Royal Society International Centre. He is a leading academic in the field of quantum optics, and the recipient of several major awards including the Royal Medal from the Royal Society and the Thomas Young Medal and Prize from the Institute of Physics. He is a former president of the Institute of Physics and Optica (then Optical Society of America), the first non North American-based person to take the position. He is described as "one of the UK’s most influential scientists and leaders of scientific policy" by his peers.

== Academic career ==
Knight's work is concerned principally with theoretical quantum optics, strong field physics and especially quantum information science. He was educated at Bedford Modern School.

When Knight began his university education he attended Sussex University to read chemistry, but soon realised physics interested him more. He received his first degree and D.Phil. from Sussex University and became research associate at the Department of Physics and Astronomy of the University of Rochester and at the Physics Department and SLAC, Stanford University (US). He spent three years doing post-doctoral research in the US in the group of Joseph Eberly which gave him experience of working with "incredibly gifted people". He was then SRC research fellow at Sussex University, and later visiting scientist at the Johns Hopkins University, Baltimore, Maryland, US.

He became Jubilee Research Fellow from 1976 to 1978 at Royal Holloway, University of London, followed by an SERC Advanced Fellowship from 1978 to 1983, first at RHC from 1978 to 1979, transferring in 1979 to Imperial College. He has remained at Imperial College ever since (apart from very frequent visits to the US), first as a lecturer 1983–1987, then reader 1987–1988 and professor since 1988. In addition, until 2010 he acted as deputy rector of Imperial College, having responsibility for the college's research.

In his capacity as a leading figure in quantum optics, Knight works on several advisory boards, including the UK Quantum Technology Initiative Strategy Advisory Board, the Photonics EPSRC Innovative Manufacturing Centre, the Winton Programme for the Physics of Sustainability in Cambridge and for several year was Chair of the Defence Scientific Advisory Council at the Ministry of Defence.

Knight has also spoken publicly about science funding in the UK, and cautioned against cuts or pauses in funding and its effect on the British economy and regularly advocates for girls in STEM subjects and women in science.

In addition to his academic work Knight was editor for more than 20 years of Journal of Modern Optics and remains editor of Contemporary Physics.

Knight is described by the Royal Society as "an influential figure within the wider UK physics community" and by Miles J. Padgett of the University of Glasgow as "one of the UK’s most influential scientists and leaders of scientific policy."

== Senior positions ==
Knight is Emeritus Professor in the department of physics at Imperial College London. From 1 October 2010, he was the principal and is now Senior Fellow in Residence of the Kavli Royal Society International Centre at Chicheley Hall. He has been a visiting professor at the University of Louvain-la-Neuve, a Humboldt Research Award holder at the University of Konstanz and a visiting scholar at the University of Texas at Austin and at the University of Rochester.

Since 1999 Knight has been a fellow of the Royal Society.

Knight was president of the Institute of Physics from 2011 to 2013; president in 2004 of Optica, the first non North American-based person to take the position; and a fellow of the Royal Society. In addition he was a member of the council of the Royal Society. He has a seat on the European advisory board of Princeton University Press. He was elected an honorary fellow of the Institute of Physics in recognition of his "major contributions to physics through his pre-eminent research, his influential leadership roles and his service to the Institute of Physics".

Knight was chief scientific advisor until his retirement to the National Physical Laboratory, and is chair of NPL's Quantum Metrology Institute. He continues to act as an advisor to the British government.

== Other awards ==
Knight was knighted in the Queen's 2005 Birthday Honours.

He was the recipient of the Frederic Ives Medal in 2008, and the Royal Medal in 2010.

He has received awards from the Institute of Physics including the Thomas Young Medal (1999) and the Glazebrook Medal.

Knight has received many honorary doctorates including an honorary doctorate from Heriot-Watt University in 2010, from University of Sussex in 2010, from University of Glasgow in 2015 and University of Birmingham in 2017.

In 2012 he became a member of the German Academy of Sciences Leopoldina.

In 2019 he received the Herbert Walther Award for his outstanding contribution to quantum information science.

Also in 2019 Knight received the highest accolade from the Institution of Engineering and Technology, the Faraday Medal for his 'outstanding contribution in the field of quantum engineering', acknowledging that 'His pivotal role in conceiving, designing and delivering the National Quantum Technologies Programme has put the UK quantum science and engineering at the front of the global race to establish the second information revolution.'

He was named an Optica Honorary Member in 2024.

== Notable publications ==
Knight is the author of several books and hundreds of academic papers. He is an ISI Highly Cited author. His publications include,:

- Concepts of quantum optics (1983, 18 editions)
- Squeezed light : special issue (1987) with Rodney Loudon in Journal of Modern Optics
- The quantum-jump approach to dissipative dynamics in quantum optics (1998) with M.B. Plenio in Reviews of Modern Physics
- Atomic physics with super-high intensity lasers (1997) with M. Protopapas and Christoph Keitel in Reports on Progress in Physics
- Introductory quantum optics (2004, 27 editions) with Christopher C. Gerry
- Springer handbook of atomic, molecular, and optical physics (2006) with S. Scheel (chapter)
- The Jaynes-Cummings Model (2007) with Bruce Shore in Journal of Modern Optics

== See also ==
- Nonclassical light
