= Quantum engineering =

Technological development using the laws of quantum mechanics

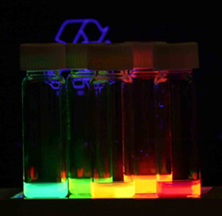
Colloidal quantum dots irradiated with a UV light. Different sized quantum dots emit different colour light due to quantum confinement.

Quantum engineering is the development of technology that capitalizes on the laws of quantum mechanics. This type of engineering uses quantum mechanics to develop technologies such as quantum sensors and quantum computers.

== History ==
From 2010 onwards, multiple governments have established programmes to explore quantum technologies, such as the UK National Quantum Technologies Programme, which created four quantum 'hubs'. These hubs are found at the Centre for Quantum Technologies in Singapore, and QuTech, a Dutch center to develop a topological quantum computer. In 2016, the European Union introduced the Quantum Technology Flagship, a €1 Billion, 10-year-long megaproject, similar in size to earlier European Future and Emerging Technologies Flagship projects. In December 2018, the United States passed the National Quantum Initiative Act, which provides a US$1 billion annual budget for quantum research. China is building the world's largest quantum research facility with a planned investment of 76 billion Yuan (approx. €10 Billion). Indian government has also invested 8000 crore Rupees (approx. US$1.02 Billion) over 5-years to boost quantum technologies under its National Quantum Mission.

In the private sector, large companies have made multiple investments in quantum technologies. Organizations such as Google, D-wave systems, and University of California Santa Barbara have formed partnerships.

== Applications ==
=== Secure communications ===
Quantum secure communication is a method that is hypothesised to be 'quantum safe' in the advent of quantum computing systems utilizing Shor's algorithm to break current cryptography systems. This is done through a number of techniques such as quantum key distribution (QKD), the use of a quantum random number generator, quantum dense coding, and quantum teleportation. Quantum key distribution (QKD), is a method of transmitting information using entangled light in a way that makes any interception of the transmission obvious to the user. A quantum random number generator can be used, which is capable of producing truly random numbers unlike non-quantum algorithms that imitate randomness. A technique called quantum dense coding can also be used where one qubit is used in place of two classic computer bits. This enhances channel capacity through entanglement. A qubit is unable to be copied. Quantum computing uses a basic unit of information called a qubit in place of a classical computer bit. Qubits are two-level quantum systems that can be denoted as having the value of 1, 0, or any superposition of these states. A qubit is unable to be copied due to the observer effect where measuring the properties of the quantum system causes the system to change. Quantum teleportation is another technique used where the quantum state of a qubit is teleported long distance without the particle itself being sent directly.

=== Computing ===
Quantum computers are hypothesised to have important uses in areas such as optimization and machine learning. They are best known for their expected ability to run Shor's algorithm, which can factor large numbers and underpins parts of modern cryptography used to secure data transmissions. This capability could allow relatively small quantum computers to outperform some of the largest supercomputers on certain mathematical problems.

Quantum simulators are types of quantum computers intended to simulate a real world system, such as a chemical compound. The idea of quantum simulators was first published in 1982 by Richard Feynman. Quantum simulators are simpler to build as opposed to general purpose quantum computers because complete control over every component is not necessary. Current quantum simulators under development include ultracold atoms in optical lattices, trapped ions, arrays of superconducting qubits, and others.

=== Machine learning ===
Quantum machine learning has also been proposed. Two examples of this are quantum clustering, where quantum principles might be used to group data into clusters and quantum autocoders that could compress and later reconstruct data.

=== Sensors ===
Quantum sensing uses certain quantum features to generate very precise measurements. For instance, the use of quantum systems like neutral atoms and "trapped ions" are being used as quantum sensors for their ability to be relatively easy to manipulate and be put into the well known state. Quantum sensors use a variety of different quantum systems to extract their measurements. Quantum sensors are hoped to have a number of applications in a wide variety technologies including positioning systems, communication technology, electric and magnetic field sensors, gravimetry.

Quantum sensors are being considered for use in civil engineering and metrology to help determine unknown underground conditions of an area. Quantum sensors complement ground penetrating radar, magnetometry, electric resistivity, and acoustic measurements. This is done by taking measurements using quantum gravimetry.

Quantum sensors are being considered in the field of medicine to detect conductivity in arteries and organs, neurons firing, the progress of chemotherapy, and isotopes inside the body. This is done through techniques such as spin entanglement, use of atomic spins as magnetic sensors and squeezed light. These techniques yield information that can be used to diagnose heart problems, malnutrition, early-stage osteoporosis, kidney disease as well as certain cancers.

== Education programs ==
Quantum engineering is evolving as an engineering discipline. For example the University of Waterloo has launched integrated postgraduate engineering programs. The Université de Sherbrooke offers a Bachelor of Science in quantum information, and the University of New South Wales offers a bachelor of quantum engineering. The Universität des Saarlandes offers a Bachelor and a Master of Science in Quantum Engineering.
