= Poncelet Prize =

French science award

The Poncelet Prize (French: Prix Poncelet) is awarded by the French Academy of Sciences. The prize was established in 1868 by the widow of General Jean-Victor Poncelet for the advancement of the sciences. It was in the amount of 2,000 francs (as of 1868), mostly for the work in applied mathematics. The precise wording of the announcement by the academy varied from year to year and required the work be "in mechanics", or "for work contributing to the progress of pure or applied mathematics", or simply "in applied mathematics", and sometimes included condition that the work must be "done during the ten years preceding the award."

== 19th century ==
- (1868) Alfred Clebsch
- (1869) Julius von Mayer
- (1870) Camille Jordan
- (1871) Joseph Boussinesq
- (1872) Amédée Mannheim, "for the general excellence of his geometrical disquisitions."
- (1873) William Thomson, "for his magnificent works on the mathematical theory of electricity and magnetism."
- (1874) Jacques Bresse, "for his work in applied mechanics."
- (1875) Gaston Darboux, "for the ensemble of his mathematical work."
- (1876) Xavier Kretz
- (1877) Edmond Laguerre, "for his mathematical works."
- (1878) Maurice Lévy
- (1879) Théodore Moutard
- (1880) Henry Léauté
- (1881) Charles Auguste Briot
- (1882) Rudolf Clausius
- (1883) Georges Henri Halphen
- (1884) Jules Hoüel
- (1885) Henri Poincaré
- (1886) Charles Émile Picard
- (1887) Paul Émile Appell
- (1888) Édouard Collignon
- (1889) Édouard Goursat
- (1890) Carlos Ibáñez e Ibáñez de Ibero, "for his dedication and the intelligent direction he gave to every matter related to his involvement at the International Committee for Weights and Measures. After more than twenty years of scrupulous studies, in 1889, and according to the resolutions of (the Convention of the Metre in) 1875, the new metre standards were distributed to countries in Europe and the Americas perpetuating the acceptance of the metric system."
- (1891) Marie Georges Humbert
- (1892) Benjamin Baker and John Fowler
- (1893) Gabriel Koenigs
- (1894) Hermann Laurent, "for the whole of his mathematical works."
- (1895) Gustave Robin
- (1896) Paul Painlevé, "for all of his mathematical work."
- (1897) Roger Liouville
- (1898) Jacques Hadamard
- (1899) Eugène Cosserat, "for the whole of his contributions to geometry and mechanics."
- (1900) Léon Lecornu

== 20th century ==
- (1901) Émile Borel
- (1902) Maurice d'Ocagne
- (1903) David Hilbert
- (1904) Désiré André
- (1905) Charles Lallemand (1857–1938)
- (1906) Claude Guichard
- (1907) Charles Renard (posthumously)
- (1908) Erik Ivar Fredholm, "for his researches on integral equations."
- (1909) Comte de Sparre, "for his studies relating to gunnery and his works on mechanics."
- (1910) Charles Riquier
- (1911) Auguste Rateau
- (1912) Edmond Maillet
- (1913) Maurice Leblanc, "for the totality of his researches in mechanics."
- (1914) Henri Lebesgue
- (1915) Charles Rabut
- (1916) Charles de la Vallée-Poussin
- (1917) Jules Andrade, "for his work in applied mechanics, especially that dealing with chronometry."
- (1918) Joseph Larmor
- (1919) Prosper Charbonnier, "for his work on ballistics"
- (1920) Élie Cartan, "for the whole of his work."
- (1921) Jacques Charles Émile Jouguet
- (1922) Jules Drach, "for the whole of his work in mathematics."
- (1923) Auguste Boulanger (posthumously), "for the whole of his scientific work."
- (1924) Ernest Vessiot, "for the whole of his work in mathematics."
- (1925) Denis Eydoux, "for the whole of his work in hydraulics."
- (1926) Paul Montel, "for his mathematical work as a whole."
- (1927) Henri Villat
- (1929) Alfred-Marie Liénard
- (1930) Arnaud Denjoy, "for the whole of his mathematical works."
- (1932) Raoul Bricard, "for his work in geometry."
- (1933) Bertrand de Fontviolant
- (1934) René Maurice Fréchet, "for the whole of his mathematical works."
- (1936) Paul Lévy, "for the whole of his mathematical works."
- (1937) Joseph Bethenod, " for his work on mechanics and electricity."
- (1938) Szolem Mandelbrojt
- (1939) Henri Bénard
- (1942) René Garnier
- (1945) Alphonse Demoulin
- (1948) Georges Valiron
- (1951) Joseph Kampé de Fériet
- (1954) Georges Darmois
- (1972) Michel Lazard
- (1975) Jean Céa
- (1978) Henri Skoda
- (1981) Philippe G. Ciarlet
- (1987) Pierre Ladeveze
- (1990) Jean-Yves Girard
- (1993) Marie Farge "for her work on the application of the wavelet transform to the study of turbulence"
- (1995) Yves Le Jan

== See also ==
- List of mathematics awards
