= Céa's lemma =

Lemma in numerical analysis of differential equations

Céa's lemma is a lemma in mathematics. Introduced by Jean Céa in his Ph.D. dissertation, it is an important tool for proving error estimates for the finite element method applied to elliptic partial differential equations.

== Lemma statement ==
Let $V$ be a real Hilbert space with the norm $\|\cdot\|.$ Let $a:V\times V\to \mathbb R$ be a bilinear form with the properties

- $|a(v, w)| \le \gamma \|v\|\,\|w\|$ for some constant $\gamma>0$ and all $v, w$ in $V$ (continuity)
- $a(v, v) \ge \alpha \|v\|^2$ for some constant $\alpha>0$ and all $v$ in $V$ (coercivity or $V$-ellipticity).

Let $L:V\to \mathbb R$ be a bounded linear operator. Consider the problem of finding an element $u$ in $V$ such that

$a(u, v)=L(v)$ for all $v$ in $V.$

Consider the same problem on a finite-dimensional subspace $V_h$ of $V,$ so, $u_h$ in $V_h$ satisfies

$a(u_h, v)=L(v)$ for all $v$ in $V_h.$

By the Lax–Milgram theorem, each of these problems has exactly one solution. Céa's lemma states that

$\|u-u_h\|\le \frac{\gamma}{\alpha}\|u-v\|$ for all $v$ in $V_h.$

That is to say, the subspace solution $u_h$ is "the best" approximation of $u$ in $V_h,$ up to the constant $\gamma/\alpha.$

The proof is straightforward

$\alpha\|u-u_h\|^2 \le a(u-u_h,u-u_h) = a(u-u_h,u-v) + a(u-u_h,v - u_h) = a(u-u_h,u-v) \le \gamma\|u-u_h\|\|u-v\|$ for all $v$ in $V_h.$

We used the $a$-orthogonality of $u-u_h$ and $v - u_h \in V_h$

$$a(u-u_h,v) = 0, \ \forall \ v \in V_h$$

which follows directly from $V_h \subset V$

$a(u, v) = L(v) = a(u_h, v)$ for all $v$ in $V_h$.

Note: Céa's lemma holds on complex Hilbert spaces also, one then uses a sesquilinear form $a(\cdot, \cdot)$ instead of a bilinear one. The coercivity assumption then becomes $|a(v, v)| \ge \alpha \|v\|^2$ for all $v$ in $V$ (notice the absolute value sign around $a(v, v)$).

== Error estimate in the energy norm ==
The subspace solution $u_h$ is the projection of $u$ onto the subspace $V_h$ in respect to the inner product $a(\cdot, \cdot)$.

In many applications, the bilinear form $a:V\times V\to \mathbb R$ is symmetric, so

$a(v, w) =a(w, v)$ for all $v, w$ in $V.$

This, together with the above properties of this form, implies that $a(\cdot, \cdot)$ is an inner product on $V.$ The resulting norm

$$\|v\|_a=\sqrt{a(v, v)}$$

is called the energy norm, since it corresponds to a physical energy in many problems. This norm is equivalent to the original norm $\|\cdot\|.$

Using the $a$-orthogonality of $u-u_h$ and $V_h$ and the Cauchy–Schwarz inequality

$\|u-u_h\|_a^2 = a(u-u_h,u-u_h) = a(u-u_h,u-v) \le \|u-u_h\|_a \cdot \|u-v\|_a$ for all $v$ in $V_h$.

Hence, in the energy norm, the inequality in Céa's lemma becomes

$\|u-u_h\|_a\le \|u-v\|_a$ for all $v$ in $V_h$

(notice that the constant $\gamma/\alpha$ on the right-hand side is no longer present).

This states that the subspace solution $u_h$ is the best approximation to the full-space solution $u$ in respect to the energy norm. Geometrically, this means that $u_h$ is the projection of the solution $u$ onto the subspace $V_h$ in respect to the inner product $a(\cdot, \cdot)$ (see the adjacent picture).

Using this result, one can also derive a sharper estimate in the norm $\| \cdot \|$. Since

$\alpha \|u-u_h\|^2 \le a(u-u_h,u-u_h) = \|u-u_h\|_a^2 \le \|u - v\|_a^2 \le \gamma \|u-v\|^2$ for all $v$ in $V_h$,

it follows that

$\|u-u_h\| \le \sqrt{\frac{\gamma}{\alpha}} \|u-v\|$ for all $v$ in $V_h$.

== An application of Céa's lemma ==
We will apply Céa's lemma to estimate the error of calculating the solution to an elliptic differential equation by the finite element method.

A string with fixed endpoints under the influence of a force pointing down.

Consider the problem of finding a function $u:[a, b]\to \mathbb R$ satisfying the conditions

$$\begin{cases}
-u''=f \mbox { in } [a, b]  \\
u(a)=u(b)=0
\end{cases}$$

where $f:[a, b]\to \mathbb R$ is a given continuous function.

Physically, the solution $u$ to this two-point boundary value problem represents the shape taken by a string under the influence of a force such that at every point $x$ between $a$ and $b$ the force density is $f(x)\mathbf{e}$ (where $\mathbf{e}$ is a unit vector pointing vertically, while the endpoints of the string are on a horizontal line, see the adjacent picture). For example, that force may be the gravity, when $f$ is a constant function (since the gravitational force is the same at all points).

Let the Hilbert space $V$ be the Sobolev space $H^1_0(a, b),$ which is the space of all square-integrable functions $v$ defined on $[a, b]$ that have a weak derivative on $[a, b]$ with $v'$ also being square integrable, and $v$ satisfies the conditions $v(a)=v(b)=0.$ The inner product on this space is

$(v, w)=\int_a^b\! \left( v(x)w(w) + v'(x) w'(x)\right)\,dx$ for all $v$ and $w$ in $V.$

After multiplying the original boundary value problem by $v$ in this space and performing an integration by parts, one obtains the equivalent problem

$a(u, v)=L(v)$ for all $v$ in $V$,

with

$$a(u, v)=\int_a^b\! u'(x) v'(x)\,dx$$,

and

$$L(v) = \int_a^b\! f(x) v(x) \, dx.$$

It can be shown that the bilinear form $a(\cdot, \cdot)$ and the operator $L$ satisfy the assumptions of Céa's lemma.

A function in $V_h$ (in red), and the typical collection of basis functions in $V_h$ (in blue).

In order to determine a finite-dimensional subspace $V_h$ of $V,$ consider a partition

$$a=x_0< x_1 < \cdots < x_{n-1} < x_n = b$$

of the interval $[a, b],$ and let $V_h$ be the space of all continuous functions that are affine on each subinterval in the partition (such functions are called piecewise-linear). In addition, assume that any function in $V_h$ takes the value 0 at the endpoints of $[a, b].$ It follows that $V_h$ is a vector subspace of $V$ whose dimension is $n-1$ (the number of points in the partition that are not endpoints).

Let $u_h$ be the solution to the subspace problem

$a(u_h, v)=L(v)$ for all $v$ in $V_h,$

so one can think of $u_h$ as of a piecewise-linear approximation to the exact solution $u.$ By Céa's lemma, there exists a constant $C>0$ dependent only on the bilinear form $a(\cdot, \cdot),$ such that

$\|u-u_h\|\le C \|u-v\|$ for all $v$ in $V_h.$

To explicitly calculate the error between $u$ and $u_h,$ consider the function $\pi u$ in $V_h$ that has the same values as $u$ at the nodes of the partition (so $\pi u$ is obtained by linear interpolation on each interval $[x_i, x_{i+1}]$ from the values of $u$ at interval's endpoints). It can be shown using Taylor's theorem that there exists a constant $K$ that depends only on the endpoints $a$ and $b,$ such that

$$|u'(x)-(\pi u)'(x)|\le K h \|u''\|_{L^2(a, b)}$$

for all $x$ in $[a, b],$ where $h$ is the largest length of the subintervals $[x_i, x_{i+1}]$ in the partition, and the norm on the right-hand side is the L^{2} norm.

This inequality then yields an estimate for the error

$$\|u-\pi u\|.$$

Then, by substituting $v=\pi u$ in Céa's lemma it follows that

$$\|u-u_h\|\le C h \|u''\|_{L^2(a, b)},$$

where $C$ is a different constant from the above (it depends only on the bilinear form, which implicitly depends on the interval $[a, b]$).

This result is of a fundamental importance, as it states that the finite element method can be used to approximately calculate the solution of our problem, and that the error in the computed solution decreases proportionately to the partition size $h.$ Céa's lemma can be applied along the same lines to derive error estimates for finite element problems in higher dimensions (here the domain of $u$ was in one dimension), and while using higher order polynomials for the subspace $V_h.$
