= Joseph Miller Thomas =

American mathematician

Joseph Miller Thomas (16 January 1898 – 1979) was an American mathematician, known for the Thomas decomposition of algebraic and differential systems.

Thomas received his Ph.D., supervised by Frederick Wahn Beal, from the University of Pennsylvania with thesis Congruences of Circles, Studied with reference to the Surface of Centers. He was a mathematics professor at Duke University for many years. His graduate students include Mabel Griffin (later married to L. B. Reavis) and Ruth W. Stokes. In 1935, he was one of the founders of the Duke Mathematical Journal. For the academic year 1936–1937, he was a visiting scholar at the Institute for Advanced Study.

Based upon earlier work by Charles Riquier and Maurice Janet, Thomas's research was important for the introduction of involutive bases.

== Selected publications ==
=== Articles ===
- with Oswald Veblen: Veblen, O.; Thomas, J. M. (1925). "Projective Normal Coördinates for the Geometry of Paths". Proceedings of the National Academy of Sciences. 11 (4): 204–7. Bibcode:1925PNAS...11..204V. doi:10.1073/pnas.11.4.204. PMC 1085921. PMID 16576871.
- Note on the projective geometry of paths. Proceedings of the National Academy of Sciences 11, no. 4 (1925): 207–209.
- The number of even and odd absolute permutations of n letters. Bull. Amer. Math. Soc. 31 (1925) 303–304. MR1561049
- Conformal correspondence of Riemann spaces. Proceedings of the National Academy of Sciences 11, no. 5 (1925): 257–259.
- Conformal invariants. Proceedings of the National Academy of Sciences 12, no. 6 (1926): 389–393.
- Asymmetric displacement of a vector. Trans. Amer. Math. Soc. 28 (1926) 658–670. MR1501370
- with Oswald Veblen: Projective invariants of affine geometry of paths. Annals of Mathematics 27 (1926): 279–296. doi:10.2307/1967848
- Riquier's existence theorems. Annals of Mathematics 30 (1928): 285–310. doi:10.2307/1968282
- Matrices of integers ordering derivatives. Trans. Amer. Math. Soc. 33 (1931) 389–410. MR1501594
- The condition for an orthonomic differential system. Trans. Amer. Math. Soc. 34 (1932) 332–338. MR1501640
- Pfaffian systems of species one. Trans. Amer. Math. Soc. 35 (1933) 356–371. MR1501689
- Riquier's existence theorems. Annals of Mathematics 35 (1934): 306–311. doi:10.2307/1968434 (addendum to 1928 publication in Annals of Mathematics)
- An existence theorem for generalized pfaffian systems. Bull. Amer. Math. Soc. 40 (1934) 309–315. MR1562842
- The condition for a pfaffian system in involution. Bull. Amer. Math. Soc. 40 (1934) 316–320. MR1562843
- Sturm's theorem for multiple roots. National Mathematics Magazine 15, no. 8 (1941): 391–394. JSTOR 3028551
- Equations equivalent to a linear differential equation. Proc. Amer. Math. Soc. 3 (1952) 899–903. MR0052001

=== Books ===
- Differential systems. 1937.
- Theory of equations. McGraw-Hill. 1938; 211 pages
- Elementary mathematics in artillery fire, by Joseph Miller Thomas with tables prepared by Vincent H. Haag. McGraw-Hill. 1942; 256 pages
- Systems and roots. William Byrd Press. 1962; 123 pages
- A primer on roots. William Byrd Press. 1974; 106 pages
