= Charles Riquier =

French mathematician

- Born: Charles Edmond Alfred Riquier; 19 November 1853; Amiens, France
- Died: 17 January 1923 (aged 69); Caen, France
- Known for: Riquier–Janet theory
- Awards: Poncelet Prize (1910)
- Scientific career
- Fields: Differential equations
- Institutions: University of Caen Normandy
- Thesis: Extension à l'hyperespace de la méthode de M. Carl Neumann pour la résolution de problèmes relatifs aux fonctions de variables réelles qui vérifient l'equation différentielle Δ F=0 (1886)

Charles Edmond Alfred Riquier (19 November 1853, Amiens – 17 January 1929, Caen) was a French mathematician.

Riquier matriculated in 1873 at the École Normale Supérieure (ENS) where he received his agrégé in mathematics in 1876. He taught from 1876 to 1878 at the Lycée de Brest and then from 1878 to 1886 at the Lycée de Caen and from 1886 to 1924 at the Université de Caen, where he retired as a professor emeritus.

After a brief leave of absence from the Lycée de Caen, Riquier received his doctorate in mathematics in 1886 from ENS at Paris with dissertation Extension à l’hyperespace de la méthode de M. Carl Neumann pour la résolution de problèmes relatifs aux fonctions de variables réelles à laplacien nul. His thesis committee consisted of Hermite (as chair), Darboux, and Picard.

In 1910 he was awarded the Poncelet Prize. In 1920 he was elected to the French Academy of Sciences as the successor to Hieronymus Zeuthen. (Eugène Fabry was elected Riquier's successor in 1931.)

Riquier, Maurice Janet, Joseph Miller Thomas, Joseph Fels Ritt, and Ellis Kolchin were among the greatest pioneers of differential algebra and symbolic computation for systems of partial differential equations.

== Selected publications ==
- Application de la théorie algébrique des formes quadratiques à la classification des lignes et des surfaces du second ordre. 1882.
- with Charles Méray: Sur la convergence des développements des intégrales ordinaires d'un système d'équations différentielles partielles. Gauthier-Villars. 1890.
- Les systèmes d'équations aux dérivées partielles. Gauthier-Villars. 1910.
- Riquier, Ch (1928). La méthode des fonctions majorantes et les systèmes d'équations aux dérivées partielles. Gauthier-Villars.
