= Ruth Stokes =

American mathematician, cryptologist and astronomer

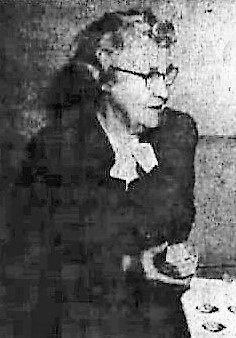
- Stokes in 1957
- Born: October 12, 1890
- Died: August 27, 1968 (aged 77)
- Education: Winthrop Normal and Industrial College (Bachelor's), Vanderbilt University (Master's), Duke University (Ph.D.)
- Known for: mathematician, cryptologist, and astronomer

Ruth Wyckliffe Stokes (October 12, 1890 or 1891 – August 27, 1968) was an American mathematician, cryptologist, and astronomer. She earned the first doctorate in mathematics from Duke University, made pioneering contributions to the theory of linear programming, and founded the Pi Mu Epsilon journal.

== Early life and education ==
Stokes was born on October 12, 1890 or 1891, in Mountville, South Carolina, one of six children of William Henry Stokes, a physician and farmer, and his wife Francis Emily Fuller Stokes. She earned a bachelor's degree in 1911 from the Winthrop Normal and Industrial College, a women's college that later became Winthrop University, and began working as a high school mathematics teacher. She was principal of a school in Rock Hill, South Carolina, from 1913 to 1916, and head of mathematics at Synodical College in Fulton, Missouri, from 1916 to 1917. She subsequently held two more teaching positions in South Carolina. During this time she also studied mathematics by correspondence through Columbia University, the University of Virginia, and the University of Chicago.

She returned to graduate study in 1922 at Vanderbilt University, where she earned a master's degree in mathematics in 1923 with a thesis in the history of mathematics on the fundamental theorem of algebra. She became an instructor at Winthrop College, and began taking summer classes at the University of Wisconsin–Madison, entering more formal doctoral study at Duke University in 1928. She completed her Ph.D. in 1931, supervised by Joseph Miller Thomas, becoming the first person to earn a doctorate in mathematics at Duke. Her dissertation, A Geometric Theory of Solution of Linear Inequalities, represented pioneering work in linear programming, following on from the work of Lloyd Dines and Hermann Minkowski.

== Career and later life ==
Stokes expected her position at Winthrop to be waiting for her on the completion of her doctorate, but David Bancroft Johnson, the president of Winthrop with whom she had made this agreement, died in 1928 and the next president did not hold to the agreement. After continuing at Duke as an instructor for a year, Stokes became a mathematics instructor at North Texas State Teachers College (now the University of North Texas) from 1932 until 1935, when she became head of mathematics at Mitchell College in Statesville, North Carolina.

In 1936, Stokes returned once more to Winthrop College where she became a professor of astronomy and mathematics and, later, the head of mathematics. Her astronomical work included an excursion to Florida to observe the solar eclipse of April 7, 1940. As a response to World War II, in 1942, she instituted a program in cryptology, and began teaching navigation and astronomy to pilots in the United States Army Air Corps. During this period at Winthrop she also chaired the Southeastern Section of the Mathematical Association of America and was president of the section for mathematics of the South Carolina Education Association.

Stokes had increasingly found herself in dispute with the Winthrop College administration, and in 1946 she moved to Syracuse University as an assistant professor of mathematics and education, promoted to associate professor in 1953. There, she became founding editor of the Pi Mu Epsilon journal in 1949. She also participated in the International Congress of Mathematicians in 1950, exhibiting a collection of mathematical models. She retired from Syracuse as associate professor emerita in 1959, continuing to teach for one more year as an associate professor at Longwood College in Farmville, Virginia.

After retirement, Stokes returned to Mountville, South Carolina. She died on August 27, 1968.

== Recognition ==
Stokes was named a Fellow of the American Association for the Advancement of Science in 1950.
