= Energetic space =

Mathematical concept of energy in physics

In mathematics, more precisely in functional analysis, an energetic space is, intuitively, a subspace of a given real Hilbert space equipped with a new "energetic" inner product. The motivation for the name comes from physics, as in many physical problems the energy of a system can be expressed in terms of the energetic inner product.

== Energetic space ==
Formally, consider a real Hilbert space $X$ with the inner product $(\cdot|\cdot)$ and the norm $\|\cdot\|$. Let $Y$ be a linear subspace of $X$ and $B:Y\to X$ be a strongly monotone symmetric linear operator, that is, a linear operator satisfying

- $(Bu|v)=(u|Bv)\,$ for all $u, v$ in $Y$
- $(Bu|u) \ge c\|u\|^2$ for some constant $c>0$ and all $u$ in $Y.$

The energetic inner product is defined as

$(u|v)_E =(Bu|v)\,$ for all $u,v$ in $Y$

and the energetic norm is

$\|u\|_E=(u|u)^\frac{1}{2}_E \,$ for all $u$ in $Y.$

The set $Y$ together with the energetic inner product is a pre-Hilbert space. The energetic space $X_E$ is defined as the completion of $Y$ in the energetic norm. $X_E$ can be considered a subset of the original Hilbert space $X,$ since any Cauchy sequence in the energetic norm is also Cauchy in the norm of $X$ (this follows from the strong monotonicity property of $B$).

The energetic inner product is extended from $Y$ to $X_E$ by

$$(u|v)_E = \lim_{n\to\infty} (u_n|v_n)_E$$

where $(u_n)$ and $(v_n)$ are sequences in Y that converge to points in $X_E$ in the energetic norm.

== Energetic extension ==
The operator $B$ admits an energetic extension $B_E$

$$B_E:X_E\to X^*_E$$

defined on $X_E$ with values in the dual space $X^*_E$ that is given by the formula

$\langle B_E u | v \rangle_E = (u|v)_E$ for all $u,v$ in $X_E.$

Here, $\langle \cdot |\cdot \rangle_E$ denotes the duality bracket between $X^*_E$ and $X_E,$ so $\langle B_E u | v \rangle_E$ actually denotes $(B_E u)(v).$

If $u$ and $v$ are elements in the original subspace $Y,$ then

$$\langle B_E u | v \rangle_E = (u|v)_E = (Bu|v) = \langle u|B|v\rangle$$

by the definition of the energetic inner product. If one views $Bu,$ which is an element in $X,$ as an element in the dual $X^*$ via the Riesz representation theorem, then $Bu$ will also be in the dual $X_E^*$ (by the strong monotonicity property of $B$). Via these identifications, it follows from the above formula that $B_E u= Bu.$ In different words, the original operator $B:Y\to X$ can be viewed as an operator $B:Y\to X_E^*,$ and then $B_E:X_E\to X^*_E$ is simply the function extension of $B$ from $Y$ to $X_E.$

== An example from physics ==
A string with fixed endpoints under the influence of a force pointing down.

Consider a string whose endpoints are fixed at two points $a<b$ on the real line (here viewed as a horizontal line). Let the vertical outer force density at each point $x$ $(a\le x \le b)$ on the string be $f(x)\mathbf{e}$, where $\mathbf{e}$ is a unit vector pointing vertically and $f:[a, b]\to \mathbb R.$ Let $u(x)$ be the deflection of the string at the point $x$ under the influence of the force. Assuming that the deflection is small, the elastic energy of the string is

$$\frac{1}{2} \int_a^b\! u'(x)^2\, dx$$

and the total potential energy of the string is

$$F(u) = \frac{1}{2} \int_a^b\! u'(x)^2\,dx - \int_a^b\! u(x)f(x)\,dx.$$

The deflection $u(x)$ minimizing the potential energy will satisfy the differential equation

$$-u''=f\,$$

with boundary conditions

$$u(a)=u(b)=0.\,$$

To study this equation, consider the space $X=L^2(a, b),$ that is, the Lp space of all square-integrable functions $u:[a, b]\to \mathbb R$ in respect to the Lebesgue measure. This space is Hilbert in respect to the inner product

$$(u|v)=\int_a^b\! u(x)v(x)\,dx,$$

with the norm being given by

$$\|u\|=\sqrt{(u|u)}.$$

Let $Y$ be the set of all Locally integrable function ($\text{L}^1_\text{loc}$) on $[a, b]$ that are twice continuously differentiable from $u:[a, b]\to \mathbb R$, with the boundary conditions $u(a)=u(b)=0.$ Then $Y$ is a linear subspace of $X.$

Consider the operator $B:Y\to X$ given by the formula

$$Bu = -u'',\,$$

so the deflection satisfies the equation $Bu=f.$ Using integration by parts and the boundary conditions, one can see that

$$(Bu|v)=-\int_a^b\! u''(x)v(x)\, dx=\int_a^b u'(x)v'(x) = (u|Bv)$$

for any $u$ and $v$ in $Y.$ Therefore, $B$ is a symmetric linear operator.

$B$ is also strongly monotone, since, by the Friedrichs' inequality

$$\|u\|^2 = \int_a^b u^2(x)\, dx \le C \int_a^b u'(x)^2\, dx = C\,(Bu|u)$$

for some $C>0.$

The energetic space in respect to the operator $B$ is then the Sobolev space $H^1_0(a, b).$ We see that the elastic energy of the string which motivated this study is

$$\frac{1}{2} \int_a^b\! u'(x)^2\, dx = \frac{1}{2} (u|u)_E,$$

so it is half of the energetic inner product of $u$ with itself.

To calculate the deflection $u$ minimizing the total potential energy $F(u)$ of the string, one writes this problem in the form

$(u|v)_E=(f|v)\,$ for all $v$ in $X_E$.

Next, one usually approximates $u$ by some $u_h$, a function in a finite-dimensional subspace of the true solution space. For example, one might let $u_h$ be a continuous piecewise linear function in the energetic space, which gives the finite element method. The approximation $u_h$ can be computed by solving a system of linear equations.

The energetic norm turns out to be the natural norm in which to measure the error between $u$ and $u_h$, see Céa's lemma.

== See also ==
- Inner product space
- Positive-definite kernel
