= Duke Mathematical Journal =

- Discipline: Mathematics
- Language: English, French
- Edited by: Richard Hain

Publication details
- History: 1935–present
- Publisher: Duke University Press (United States)
- Frequency: 18/year
- Impact factor: 2.539 (2017)

Standard abbreviations
- ISO 4: Duke Math. J.

Indexing
- CODEN: DUMJAO
- ISSN: 0012-7094 (print); 1547-7398 (web)
- LCCN: 36016815
- OCLC no.: 473862258

Links
- Journal homepage; Online access

Duke Mathematical Journal is a peer-reviewed mathematics journal published by Duke University Press. It was established in 1935. The founding editors-in-chief were David Widder, Arthur Coble, and Joseph Miller Thomas. The first issue included a paper by Solomon Lefschetz. Leonard Carlitz served on the editorial board for 35 years, from 1938 to 1973.

The current managing editor is Richard Hain (Duke University).

== Impact ==
According to the journal homepage, the journal has a 2018 impact factor of 2.194, ranking it in the top ten mathematics journals in the world.
