= Prosper Charbonnier =

Prosper Jules Elie Charbonnier (1862 –1936) was a French naval officer, engineer, and ballistics expert.

Charbonnier entered the l‘Ecole polytechnique in 1884 and served in Lorient in the Régiment d’Artillerie de Marine (RAMA). He was promoted to capitaine en second en 1892 and then was appointed a member of the Commission for Artillery Experiments at Gâvres. In 1895 he was promoted to capitaine en premier en 1895. After serving in Tonkin and in China, he was promoted to squadron leader in 1903 and to lieutenant colonel in 1907. In 1910, he joined the new corps of engineers of naval artillery with the rank of ingénieur en chef de deuxième classe. Charbonnier was promoted to director of naval artillery in Lorient and to president-director of the Commission of Gâvres in 1911, to ingénieur en chef de première classe in 1912, and to ingénieur général de deuxième classe in 1915. In 1918 he was appointed the Inspector General of the services of studies and experiments in naval artillery. He was a member of the Comité scientifique des poudres. He retired from the navy in 1927.

In 1915, Charbonnier sent a memo to his superiors, resulting in the recruitment of several noted French mathematicians to the work at Gâvres. Among those who worked at Gâvres were Albert Châtelet, Georges Valiron, Joseph Kampé de Fériet, and Arnaud Denjoy.

Charbonnier became internationally recognized as a ballistics expert, and for his treatises on ballistics he was awarded in 1919 the Poncelet Prize of the Académie des Sciences. In 1924 he was an Invited Speaker of the ICM in Toronto.

== Selected publications ==
- Le champ acoustique (1904)
- Traité de Balistique extérieure (1904)
- Balistique extérieure rationnelle (1907)
- Balistique intérieure (1908)
- Traité de balistique (Tome 1, 1921 – Tome 2, 1927)
- Essai sur l’histoire de la balistique (Prix Binoux de l’Académie des Sciences) en 1929.
