= Théodore Moutard =

French mining engineer

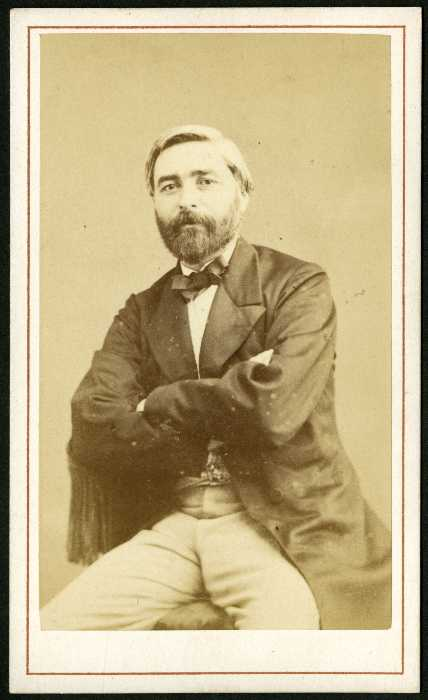
Photo by André Bujeaud

Théodore Florentin Moutard (27 July 1827 – 13 March 1901) was a French mining engineer who worked at the École des Mines and contributed to mathematical geometry. The Moutard transformation in inverse geometry is named after him.

Moutard was born in Soultz, Haut-Rhin, to Florentin and Elisabeth BERNOU. He was educated at the École Polytechnique and graduated in 1846 and entered the École des Mines and after graduating in 1849 he joined the Mining corps but was discharged in 1852 as he refused to take the oath required following the overthrow of Napoleon III. He joined back in 1870 and became a professor of mechanics at the École des Mines in 1875. He was also an examiner for the École Polytechnique from 1883. Moutard contributed to the La grande encyclopédie and his mathematical work was on algebraic surfaces and differential geometry. He collaborated with Victor Poncelet on elliptic functions.

He was made Commander of the Legion of Honor in 1899. Moutard married twice and had two sons and two daughters. One of his sons was Douard Julien Moutard (1877–1948). One daughter Berthe married the mathematician Hermann Laurent. A daughter from his second marriage, Elisabeth married André Bujeaud, a politician and photographer, in 1868.
