= Marie Farge =

French mathematician and physicist

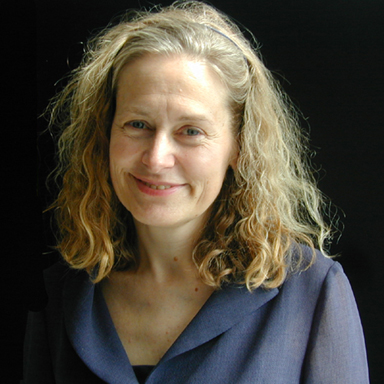
Marie Farge in 2003

Marie Farge (born 1953) is a French mathematician and physicist who works as a director of research at CNRS, the French National Centre for Scientific Research. She is known for her research on wavelets and turbulence in fluid mechanics.

== Education and career ==
Farge earned a master's degree from Stanford University in 1977, and a third cycle doctorate in physics from Paris Diderot University in 1980. After postdoctoral studies on a Fulbright Fellowship at Harvard University, she continued her studies at Pierre and Marie Curie University, where she completed a state doctorate in 1987.

She has been a researcher at CNRS since 1981. She has also held short-term positions at many other universities, including being Sofia Kovaleskaia Chair of Mathematics in 1994–95 at Kaiserslautern University.

== Recognition ==
Farge was the 1993 winner of the Poncelet Prize of the French Academy of Sciences. She became a member of the Academia Europaea in 2005, and a fellow of the American Physical Society in 2011.
