= Jean Céa =

French mathematician (1932–2024)

Jean Céa (8 February 1932 – 9 January 2024) was a French mathematician.

Born to Spanish immigrants in Aïn Témouchent, Algeria (he learnt French in school), he studied at the Ecole normale d'instituteurs d'Oran and the École normale supérieure de Saint-Cloud, obtaining his Ph.D. in 1964 with his dissertation Approximation variationnelle des problèmes aux limites. In his thesis he proved the Céa's lemma, an important result related to error estimation in the Finite Element Method.

Céa was emeritus professor at the University of Nice Sophia Antipolis and member of the Academia Europaea. In 1975 he was awarded the Poncelet Prize.

Céa died on 9 January 2024 in Nice, at the age of 91.

== Works ==
- Approximation variationnelle des problèmes aux limites, Annales de l'Institut Fourier 14, vol 2, pp. 345–444, 1964, pdf
- Optimisation: théorie et algorithmes, Dunod 1971
- Lectures on optimization: theory and algorithms, Tata Institute of Fundamental Research, Springer 1978, pdf
- Approximation et méthodes itératives de résolution d'inéquations variationnelles et de problèmes non linéaires, Institut de recherche d'information et d'automatique (IRIA), Rocquencourt 1974
- Une vie de mathématicien. Mes émerveillements, Harmattan 2010
- Jeunes pousses en folie, Harmattan 2012 (Roman)
