= Strongly monotone operator =

Math concept

In functional analysis, a set-valued mapping $A:X\to 2^X$ where X is a real Hilbert space is said to be strongly monotone if

$$\exists c > 0 \mbox{ s.t. } \langle u - v , x - y \rangle \geq c \|x - y\|^2 \quad \forall x,y\in X, u\in Ax, v\in Ay$$.

This is analogous to the notion of strictly increasing for scalar-valued functions of one scalar argument.

Equivalently, a binary relation $R \subseteq X^2$ is strongly monotone if

$$\exists c > 0 \mbox{ s.t. } \langle u - v, x - y \rangle \geq c \| x - y \|^2 \quad \forall \langle x, u \rangle, \langle y, v \rangle \in R$$.

A function $f : X \to X$ is strongly monotone if

$$\exists c > 0 \mbox{ s.t. } \langle f(x) - f(y), x - y \rangle \geq c \| x - y \|^2 \quad \forall x, y \in X$$.

== See also ==
- Monotonic function
