= Maurice Janet =

French mathematician

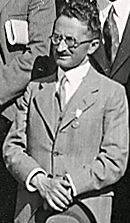
- Maurice Janet, Zürich 1932
- Born: Maurice Léopold René Janet; 24 October 1888; Grenoble, France
- Died: 17 January 1983 (aged 94)
- Known for: Janet basis Riquier–Janet theory
- Scientific career
- Fields: Differential equations

Maurice Janet (French: [mɔʁis ʒanɛ]; 1888–1983) was a French mathematician.

== Education and career ==
In 1912, as a student he visited the University of Göttingen. He was a professor at the University of Caen. He was an Invited Speaker of the International Congress of Mathematicians in 1924 in Toronto, in 1932 in Zürich, and in 1936 in Oslo.

Named in his honor are Janet bases, Janet sequences and a related algorithm in the theory of systems of partial differential equations. In 1926, he proved results that were later generalized by John Forbes Nash Jr. in his embedding theorem.

In 1948, Janet was the president of the Société Mathématique de France. He was a close friend of the mathematician Ernest Vessiot.

== Selected publications ==
=== Articles ===
- Les systèmes d'équations aux dérivées partielles, Journal de mathématiques pures et appliquées 8 ser., t. 3 (1920), pages 65–123. (paper in which what is now called the Janet basis was introduced)
- Janet, Maurice (1924). "Les modules de formes algébriques et la théorie générale des systèmes différentiels" (PDF). Annales Scientifiques de l'École Normale Supérieure. series 3. 41: 27–65. doi:10.24033/asens.754.
- "Sur la possibilité de plonger un espace riemannien donné dans un espace euclidien" (PDF). Annales de la Société Polonaise de Mathématique. 5. 1926.
- "Les systèmes d'équations aux dérivées partielles" (PDF). Mémorial des Sciences Mathématiques. 21: 1–55. 1927.
- Janet, Maurice (1929). "Les systèmes comprenant autant d'équations aux dérivées partielles que de fonctions inconnues. Caractéristiques singulières des systèmes normaux. Caractéristiques ordinaires des systèmes anormaux". Journal de Mathématiques Pures et Appliquées. 8: 339–352.

=== Books ===
- Leçons sur les systèmes d'équations aux dérivées partielles. 1929.
- Janet, Maurice (1941). Équations intégrales et applications à certains problèmes de la physique mathématique.
- Précis de calcul matriciel et de calcul opérationnel. 1954.
- Compléments divers sur la transformation de Laplace et les équations aux dérivés partielles. 1955.
- Mécanique analytique et mécanique céleste. Sujets proposés aux examens écrits de 1954 à 1959. 1966.
