= Paul Matthieu Hermann Laurent =

French mathematician

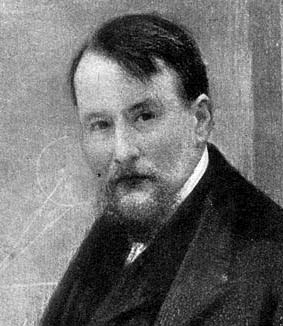
- Born: 2 September 1841; Luxembourg City, Luxembourg
- Died: 19 February 1908 (aged 66); Paris, France
- Scientific career
- Fields: Mathematics

Paul Matthieu Hermann Laurent (2 September 1841 in Luxembourg City – 19 February 1908 in Paris, France) was a French mathematician. Despite his large body of works, Laurent series expansions for complex functions were not named after him, but after Pierre Alphonse Laurent.

== Publications ==
- Théorie des séries, contenant 1^{e} les règles de convergence et les propriétés fondamentales des séries, 2^{e} l'étude et la sommation de quelques séries, 3^{e} quelques applications de la théorie des séries au calcul des expressions transcend. 1862.
- Traité d'analyse. 1885.
- Élimination. 1900.
- Sur les principes fondamentaux de la théorie des nombres et de la géométrie. 1902.
- La Géométrie analytique générale. 1906.
- Statistique mathématique. 1908.
