= Dynamical pictures =

Formulations of quantum mechanics

In quantum mechanics, dynamical pictures (or representations) are the multiple equivalent ways to mathematically formulate the dynamics of a quantum system.

The two most important ones are the Heisenberg picture and the Schrödinger picture. These differ only by a basis change with respect to time-dependency, analogous to the Lagrangian and Eulerian specification of the flow field: in short, time dependence is attached to quantum states in the Schrödinger picture and to operators in the Heisenberg picture.

There is also an intermediate formulation known as the interaction picture (or Dirac picture) which is useful for doing computations when a complicated Hamiltonian has a natural decomposition into a simple "free" Hamiltonian and a perturbation.

Equations that apply in one picture do not necessarily hold in the others, because time-dependent unitary transformations relate operators in one picture to the analogous operators in the others. Not all textbooks and articles make explicit which picture each operator comes from, which can lead to confusion.

== Schrödinger picture ==
=== Background ===
In elementary quantum mechanics, the state of a quantum-mechanical system is represented by a complex-valued wavefunction ψ(x, t). More abstractly, the state may be represented as a state vector, or ket, |ψ⟩. This ket is an element of a Hilbert space, a vector space containing all possible states of the system. A quantum-mechanical operator is a function which takes a ket |ψ⟩ and returns some other ket |ψ′⟩.

The differences between the Schrödinger and Heiseinberg pictures of quantum mechanics revolve around how to deal with systems that evolve in time: the time-dependent nature of the system must be carried by some combination of the state vectors and the operators. For example, a quantum harmonic oscillator may be in a state |ψ⟩ for which the expectation value of the momentum, $\langle \psi | \hat{p} | \psi \rangle$, oscillates sinusoidally in time. One can then ask whether this sinusoidal oscillation should be reflected in the state vector |ψ⟩, the momentum operator $\hat{p}$, or both. All three of these choices are valid; the first gives the Schrödinger picture, the second the Heisenberg picture, and the third the interaction picture.

The Schrödinger picture is useful when dealing with a time-independent Hamiltonian H, that is, $\partial_tH=0$.

=== The time evolution operator ===
==== Definition ====
The time-evolution operator U(t, t_{0}) is defined as the operator which acts on the ket at time t_{0} to produce the ket at some other time t:

$$| \psi(t) \rangle = U(t,t_0) | \psi(t_0) \rangle.$$

For bras, we instead have

$$\langle \psi(t) | = \langle \psi(t_0) |U^{\dagger}(t,t_0).$$

==== Properties ====
===== Unitarity =====
The time evolution operator must be unitary. This is because we demand that the norm of the state ket must not change with time. That is,

$$\langle \psi(t)| \psi(t) \rangle = \langle \psi(t_0)|U^{\dagger}(t,t_0)U(t,t_0)| \psi(t_0) \rangle  = \langle \psi(t_0) | \psi(t_0) \rangle.$$

Therefore,

$$U^{\dagger}(t,t_0)U(t,t_0)=I.$$

===== Identity =====
When t = t_{0}, U is the identity operator, since

$$| \psi(t_0) \rangle = U(t_0,t_0) | \psi(t_0) \rangle.$$

===== Closure =====
Time evolution from t_{0} to t may be viewed as a two-step time evolution, first from t_{0} to an intermediate time t_{1}, and then from t_{1} to the final time t. Therefore,

$$U(t,t_0) = U(t,t_1)U(t_1,t_0).$$

==== Differential equation for time evolution operator ====
We drop the t_{0} index in the time evolution operator with the convention that t_{0} = 0 and write it as U(t). The Schrödinger equation is

$$i \hbar \frac{\partial}{\partial t} |\psi(t)\rangle = H |\psi(t)\rangle,$$

where H is the Hamiltonian. Now using the time-evolution operator U to write $|\psi(t)\rangle = U(t) |\psi(0)\rangle$, we have

$$i \hbar {\partial \over \partial t} U(t) | \psi (0) \rangle = H U(t)| \psi (0)\rangle.$$

Since $|\psi(0)\rangle$ is a constant ket (the state ket at t = 0), and since the above equation is true for any constant ket in the Hilbert space, the time evolution operator must obey the equation

$$i \hbar {\partial \over \partial t} U(t) = H U(t).$$

If the Hamiltonian is independent of time, the solution to the above equation is

$$U(t) = e^{-iHt / \hbar}.$$

Since H is an operator, this exponential expression is to be evaluated via its Taylor series:

$$e^{-iHt / \hbar} = 1 - \frac{iHt}{\hbar} - \frac{1}{2}\left(\frac{Ht}{\hbar}\right)^2 + \cdots .$$

Therefore,

$$| \psi(t) \rangle = e^{-iHt / \hbar} | \psi(0) \rangle.$$

Note that $|\psi(0)\rangle$ is an arbitrary ket. However, if the initial ket is an eigenstate of the Hamiltonian, with eigenvalue E, we get:

$$| \psi(t) \rangle = e^{-iEt / \hbar} | \psi(0) \rangle.$$

Thus we see that the eigenstates of the Hamiltonian are stationary states: they only pick up an overall phase factor as they evolve with time.

If the Hamiltonian is dependent on time, but the Hamiltonians at different times commute, then the time evolution operator can be written as

$$U(t) = \exp\left({-\frac{i}{\hbar} \int_0^t H(t')\, dt'}\right),$$

If the Hamiltonian is dependent on time, but the Hamiltonians at different times do not commute, then the time evolution operator can be written as

$$U(t) = \mathrm{T}\exp\left({-\frac{i}{\hbar} \int_0^t H(t')\, dt'}\right),$$

where T is time-ordering operator, which is sometimes known as the Dyson series, after Freeman Dyson.

The alternative to the Schrödinger picture is to switch to a rotating reference frame, which is itself being rotated by the propagator. Since the undulatory rotation is now being assumed by the reference frame itself, an undisturbed state function appears to be truly static. This is the Heisenberg picture (below).

== Heisenberg picture ==
The Heisenberg picture is a formulation (made by Werner Heisenberg while on Heligoland in the 1920s) of quantum mechanics in which the operators (observables and others) incorporate a dependency on time, but the state vectors are time-independent.

=== Definition ===
In the Heisenberg picture of quantum mechanics the state vector, $|\psi \rang$, does not change with time, and an observable A satisfies

$\frac{d}{dt}A(t)=\frac{i}{\hbar}[H,A(t)]+\frac{\partial A(t)}{\partial t},$

where H is the Hamiltonian and [•,•] denotes the commutator of two operators (in this case H and A). Taking expectation values yields the Ehrenfest theorem featured in the correspondence principle.

By the Stone–von Neumann theorem, the Heisenberg picture and the Schrödinger picture are unitarily equivalent. In some sense, the Heisenberg picture is more natural and convenient than the equivalent Schrödinger picture, especially for relativistic theories. Lorentz invariance is manifest in the Heisenberg picture. This approach also has a more direct similarity to classical physics: by replacing the commutator above by the Poisson bracket, the Heisenberg equation becomes an equation in Hamiltonian mechanics.

=== Derivation of Heisenberg's equation ===
The expectation value of an observable A, which is a Hermitian linear operator for a given state $|\psi(t)\rang$, is given by

$$\lang A \rang _t = \lang \psi (t) | A | \psi(t) \rang.$$

In the Schrödinger picture, the state $|\psi\rang$ at time t is related to the state $|\psi\rang$ at time 0 by a unitary time-evolution operator, $U(t)$:
$$|\psi(t)\rangle = U(t) |\psi(0)\rangle.$$
If the Hamiltonian does not vary with time, then the time-evolution operator can be written as
$$U(t) = e^{-iHt / \hbar} ,$$
where H is the Hamiltonian and ħ is the reduced Planck constant. Therefore,

$$\lang A \rang _t = \lang \psi (0) | e^{iHt / \hbar} A e^{-iHt / \hbar} | \psi(0) \rang .$$

Define, then,
$$A(t) := e^{iHt / \hbar} A e^{-iHt / \hbar} .$$

It follows that
$$\begin{align}
\frac{d}{dt} A(t) &= \frac{i}{\hbar} H e^{iHt / \hbar} A e^{-iHt / \hbar} + e^{iHt / \hbar} \left(\frac{\partial A}{\partial t}\right) e^{-iHt / \hbar} + \frac{i}{\hbar} e^{iHt / \hbar} A \cdot (-H) e^{-iHt / \hbar} \\
&= \frac{i}{\hbar} e^{iHt / \hbar} \left( H A - A H \right) e^{-iHt / \hbar} + e^{iHt / \hbar} \left(\frac{\partial A}{\partial t}\right) e^{-iHt / \hbar} \\
&= \frac{i}{\hbar} \left( H A(t) - A(t) H \right) + e^{iHt / \hbar} \left(\frac{\partial A}{\partial t}\right)e^{-iHt / \hbar} .
\end{align}$$

Differentiation was according to the product rule, while ∂A/∂t is the time derivative of the initial A, not the A(t) operator defined. The last equation holds since exp(−iHt/ħ) commutes with H.

Thus
$$\frac{d}{dt} A(t) = \frac{i}{\hbar} [H, A(t)] + e^{iHt / \hbar} \left(\frac{\partial A}{\partial t}\right)e^{-iHt / \hbar} ,$$
whence the above Heisenberg equation of motion emerges, since the convective functional dependence on x(0) and p(0) converts to the same dependence on x(t), p(t), so that the last term converts to ∂A(t)/∂t . [X, Y] is the commutator of two operators and is defined as [X, Y] := XY − YX.

The equation is solved by the A(t) defined above, as evident by use of the standard operator identity,
$${e^B A e^{-B}} = A + [B,A] + \frac{1}{2!} [B,[B,A]] + \frac{1}{3!}[B,[B,[B,A]]] + \cdots .$$
which implies
$$A(t) = A + \frac{it}{\hbar}[H,A] - \frac{t^{2}}{2!\hbar^{2}}[H,[H,A]] - \frac{it^3}{3!\hbar^3}[H,[H,[H,A]]] + \dots$$

This relation also holds for classical mechanics, the classical limit of the above, given the correspondence between Poisson brackets and commutators,
$$[A,H] \leftrightarrow  i\hbar\{A,H\}$$
In classical mechanics, for an A with no explicit time dependence,
$$\{A,H\} = \frac{d}{dt}A \,,$$
so, again, the expression for A(t) is the Taylor expansion around t = 0.

=== Commutator relations ===
Commutator relations may look different from in the Schrödinger picture, because of the time dependence of operators. For example, consider the operators x(t_{1}), x(t_{2}), p(t_{1}) and p(t_{2}). The time evolution of those operators depends on the Hamiltonian of the system. Considering the one-dimensional harmonic oscillator,

$$H=\frac{p^{2}}{2m}+\frac{m\omega^{2}x^{2}}{2}$$,

the evolution of the position and momentum operators is given by:

$${d \over dt} x(t) = {i \over \hbar } [ H  , x(t) ]=\frac {p}{m}$$,
$${d \over dt} p(t) = {i \over \hbar } [ H  , p(t) ]= -m \omega^{2} x$$.

Differentiating both equations once more and solving for them with proper initial conditions,

$$\dot{p}(0)=-m\omega^{2} x_0 ,$$
$$\dot{x}(0)=\frac{p_0}{m} ,$$

leads to

$$x(t)=x_{0}\cos(\omega t)+\frac{p_{0}}{\omega m}\sin(\omega t)$$,
$$p(t)=p_{0}\cos(\omega t)-m\omega\!x_{0}\sin(\omega t)$$.

Direct computation yields the more general commutator relations,

$$[x(t_{1}), x(t_{2})]=\frac{i\hbar}{m\omega}\sin(\omega t_{2}-\omega t_{1})$$,
$$[p(t_{1}), p(t_{2})]=i\hbar m\omega\sin(\omega t_{2}-\omega t_{1})$$,
$$[x(t_{1}), p(t_{2})]=i\hbar \cos(\omega t_{2}-\omega t_{1})$$.

For $t_{1}=t_{2}$, one simply recovers the standard canonical commutation relations valid in all pictures.

== Interaction picture ==
The interaction Picture is most useful when the evolution of the observables can be solved exactly, confining any complications to the evolution of the states. For this reason, the Hamiltonian for the observables is called "free Hamiltonian" and the Hamiltonian for the states is called "interaction Hamiltonian".

=== Definition ===
Operators and state vectors in the interaction picture are related by a change of basis (unitary transformation) to those same operators and state vectors in the Schrödinger picture.

To switch into the interaction picture, we divide the Schrödinger picture Hamiltonian into two parts,

$H_S = H_{0,S} + H_{1, S} ~.$

Any possible choice of parts will yield a valid interaction picture; but in order for the interaction picture to be useful in simplifying the analysis of a problem, the parts will typically be chosen so that $H_{0,S}$ is well understood and exactly solvable, while $H_{1,S}$ contains some harder-to-analyze perturbation to this system.

If the Hamiltonian has explicit time-dependence (for example, if the quantum system interacts with an applied external electric field that varies in time), it will usually be advantageous to include the explicitly time-dependent terms with $H_{1,S}$, leaving $H_{0,S}$ time-independent. We proceed assuming that this is the case. If there is a context in which it makes sense to have $H_{0,S}$ be time-dependent, then one can proceed by replacing $e^{\pm i H_{0,S} t/\hbar}$ by the corresponding time-evolution operator in the definitions below.

==== State vectors ====
A state vector in the interaction picture is defined as

$| \psi_{I}(t) \rangle = e^{i H_{0, S} t / \hbar} | \psi_{S}(t) \rangle ~,$

where $| \psi_{S}(t) \rangle$ is the same state vector as in the Schrödinger picture.

==== Operators ====
An operator in the interaction picture is defined as

$A_{I}(t) = e^{i H_{0,S} t / \hbar} A_{S}(t) e^{-i H_{0,S} t / \hbar}.$

Note that $A_S(t)$ will typically not depend on t, and can be rewritten as just $A_S$. It only depends on t if the operator has "explicit time dependence", for example due to its dependence on an applied, external, time-varying electric field.

===== Hamiltonian operator =====
For the operator $H_0$ itself, the interaction picture and Schrödinger picture coincide,

$$H_{0,I}(t) = e^{i H_{0,S} t / \hbar} H_{0,S} e^{-i H_{0,S} t / \hbar} = H_{0,S} .$$

This is easily seen through the fact that operators commute with differentiable functions of themselves. This particular operator then can be called H_{0} without ambiguity.

For the perturbation Hamiltonian H_{1,I}, however,

$$H_{1,I}(t) = e^{i H_{0,S} t / \hbar} H_{1,S} e^{-i H_{0,S} t / \hbar} ,$$

where the interaction picture perturbation Hamiltonian becomes a time-dependent Hamiltonian—unless [H_{1,s}, H_{0,s}] = 0 .

It is possible to obtain the interaction picture for a time-dependent Hamiltonian H_{0,s}(t) as well, but the exponentials need to be replaced by the unitary propagator for the evolution generated by H_{0,s}(t), or more explicitly with a time-ordered exponential integral.

===== Density matrix =====
The density matrix can be shown to transform to the interaction picture in the same way as any other operator. In particular, let $\rho_I$ and $\rho_S$ be the density matrix in the interaction picture and the Schrödinger picture, respectively. If there is probability $p_n$ to be in the physical state $|\psi_n\rang$, then

$$\rho_I(t) = \sum_n p_n(t) |\psi_{n,I}(t)\rang \lang \psi_{n,I}(t)| = \sum_n p_n(t) e^{i H_{0, S} t / \hbar}|\psi_{n,S}(t)\rang \lang \psi_{n,S}(t)|e^{-i H_{0, S} t / \hbar}  = e^{i H_{0, S} t / \hbar} \rho_S(t) e^{-i H_{0, S} t / \hbar}.$$

=== Time-evolution equations ===
==== States ====
Transforming the Schrödinger equation into the interaction picture gives:

$$i \hbar \frac{d}{dt} | \psi_{I} (t) \rang = H_{1, I}(t) | \psi_{I} (t) \rang.$$

This equation is referred to as the Schwinger–Tomonaga equation.

==== Operators ====
If the operator $A_{S}$ is time independent (i.e., does not have "explicit time dependence"; see above), then the corresponding time evolution for $A_I(t)$ is given by:

$$i\hbar\frac{d}{dt}A_I(t)=\left[A_I(t),H_0\right].\;$$

In the interaction picture the operators evolve in time like the operators in the Heisenberg picture with the Hamiltonian $H'=H_0$.

==== Density matrix ====
Transforming the Schwinger–Tomonaga equation into the language of the density matrix (or equivalently, transforming the von Neumann equation into the interaction picture) gives:

$$i\hbar \frac{d}{dt} \rho_I(t) = \left[ H_{1,I}(t), \rho_I(t)\right].$$

=== Existence ===
The interaction picture does not always exist. In interacting quantum field theories, Haag's theorem states that the interaction picture does not exist. This is because the Hamiltonian cannot be split into a free and an interacting part within a superselection sector. Moreover, even if in the Schrödinger picture the Hamiltonian does not depend on time, e.g. H = H_{0} + V, in the interaction picture it does, at least, if V does not commute with H_{0}, since

$$H_{\rm int}(t)\equiv e^{{(i/\hbar})tH_0}\,V\,e^{{(-i/\hbar})tH_0}$$.

== Comparison of pictures ==
The Heisenberg picture is closest to classical Hamiltonian mechanics (for example, the commutators appearing in the above equations directly correspond to classical Poisson brackets). The Schrödinger picture, the preferred formulation in introductory texts, is easy to visualize in terms of Hilbert space rotations of state vectors, although it lacks natural generalization to Lorentz invariant systems. The Dirac picture is most useful in nonstationary and covariant perturbation theory, so it is suited to quantum field theory and many-body physics.

=== Summary comparison of evolutions ===
Evolution of:	Picture		
Evolution of:	Schrödinger (S)	Heisenberg (H)	Interaction (I)
Ket state	$| \psi_{\rm S}(t) \rang = e^{-i H_{\rm S} ~t / \hbar} | \psi_{\rm S}(0) \rang$	constant	$| \psi_{\rm I}(t) \rang = e^{i H_{0, \mathrm{S}} ~t / \hbar} | \psi_{\rm S}(t) \rang$
Observable	constant	$A_{\rm H} (t)=e^{i H_{\rm S}~ t / \hbar} A_{\rm S} e^{-i H_{\rm S}~ t / \hbar}$	$A_{\rm I} (t)=e^{i H_{0, \mathrm{S}} ~t / \hbar} A_{\rm S} e^{-i H_{0, \mathrm{S}}~ t / \hbar}$
Density matrix	$\rho_{\rm S} (t)= e^{-i H_{ \rm S} ~t / \hbar} \rho_{\rm S}(0) e^{i H_{\rm S}~ t / \hbar}$	constant	$\rho_{\rm I} (t)=e^{i H_{0, \mathrm{S}} ~t / \hbar} \rho_{\rm S} (t) e^{-i H_{0, \mathrm{S}}~ t / \hbar}$

=== Equivalence ===
It is evident that the expected values of all observables are the same in the Schrödinger, Heisenberg, and interaction pictures,

$$\langle\psi\mid A(t)\mid\psi\rangle=\langle\psi(t)\mid A\mid\psi(t)\rangle   =\langle\psi_I(t)\mid A_I(t)\mid\psi_I(t)\rangle ~,$$

as they must.

== See also ==
- Hamilton–Jacobi equation
- Bra-ket notation
