= List of mathematical topics in quantum theory =

This is a list of mathematical topics in quantum theory, by Wikipedia page. See also list of functional analysis topics, list of Lie group topics, list of quantum-mechanical systems with analytical solutions.

== Mathematical formulation of quantum mechanics ==
- bra–ket notation
- canonical commutation relation
- complete set of commuting observables
- Heisenberg picture
- Hilbert space
- Interaction picture
- Measurement in quantum mechanics
- quantum field theory
- quantum logic
- quantum operation
- Schrödinger picture
- semiclassical
- statistical ensemble
- wavefunction
- wave–particle duality
- Wightman axioms
- WKB approximation

== Schrödinger equation ==
- quantum mechanics, matrix mechanics, Hamiltonian (quantum mechanics)
- particle in a box
- particle in a ring
- particle in a spherically symmetric potential
- quantum harmonic oscillator
- hydrogen atom
- ring wave guide
- particle in a one-dimensional lattice (periodic potential)
- Fock symmetry in theory of hydrogen

== Symmetry ==
- identical particles
- angular momentum
  - angular momentum operator
- rotational invariance
  - rotational symmetry
  - rotation operator
- translational symmetry
- Lorentz symmetry
- Parity transformation
- Noether's theorem
- Noether charge
- Spin (physics)
  - isospin
- Aman matrices
- scale invariance
- spontaneous symmetry breaking
- supersymmetry breaking

== Quantum states ==
- quantum number
- Pauli exclusion principle
- quantum indeterminacy
- uncertainty principle
- wavefunction collapse
- zero-point energy
- bound state
- coherent state
  - squeezed coherent state
- density state
- Fock state, Fock space
- vacuum state
- quasinormal mode
- no-cloning theorem
- quantum entanglement

== Dirac equation ==
- spinor, spinor group, spinor bundle
- Dirac sea
- Spin foam
- Poincaré group
- gamma matrices
- Dirac adjoint
- Wigner's classification
- anyon

== Interpretations of quantum mechanics ==
- Copenhagen interpretation
- locality principle
- Bell's theorem
  - Bell test loopholes
- CHSH inequality
- hidden variable theory
- path integral formulation, quantum action
- Bohm interpretation
- many-worlds interpretation
- Tsirelson's bound

== Quantum field theory ==
- Feynman diagram
  - One-loop Feynman diagram
- Schwinger's quantum action principle
- Propagator
- Annihilation operator
- S-matrix
- Standard Model
- Local quantum physics
- Nonlocal
- Effective field theory
- Correlation function (quantum field theory)
- Renormalizable
- Cutoff
- Infrared divergence, infrared fixed point
- Ultraviolet divergence
- Fermi's interaction
- Path-ordering
- Landau pole
- Higgs mechanism
- Wilson line
- Wilson loop
- Tadpole (physics)
- Lattice gauge theory
- BRST charge
- Anomaly (physics)
- Chiral anomaly
- Braid statistics
- Plekton

== Computation ==
- quantum computing
- qubit
- qutrit
- pure qubit state
- quantum dot
- Kane quantum computer
- quantum cryptography
- quantum decoherence
- quantum circuit
- universal quantum computer
- measurement based Quantum Computing
- timeline of quantum computing

== Supersymmetry ==
- Lie superalgebra
- supergroup (physics)
- supercharge
- supermultiplet
- supergravity

== Quantum gravity ==
- theory of everything
- loop quantum gravity
- spin network
- black hole thermodynamics

== Non-commutative geometry ==
- Anticommutative property
- Hopf algebra
- Noncommutative quantum field theory
- Quantum group

== String theory ==
See list of string theory topics

- Matrix model
