= Dirac–von Neumann axioms =

Formulation of quantum mechanics on a Hilbert Space

In mathematical physics, the Dirac–von Neumann axioms give a mathematical formulation of quantum mechanics in terms of operators on a Hilbert space. They were introduced by Paul Dirac in 1930 and John von Neumann in 1932.

== Hilbert space formulation ==
The space $\mathbb{H}$ is a fixed complex Hilbert space of countably infinite dimension (as a hilbert-basis).

- The observables of a quantum system are defined to be the (possibly unbounded) self-adjoint operators $A$ on $\mathbb{H}$.
- A state $\psi$ of the quantum system is a unit vector of $\mathbb{H}$, up to scalar multiples; or equivalently, a ray of the Hilbert space $\mathbb{H}$.
- The expectation value of an observable A for a system in a state $\psi$ is given by the inner product $\langle \psi, A \psi \rangle$.

== Operator algebra formulation ==
The Dirac–von Neumann axioms can be formulated in terms of a C*-algebra as follows.

- The bounded observables of the quantum mechanical system are defined to be the self-adjoint elements of the C*-algebra.
- The states of the quantum mechanical system are defined to be the states of the C*-algebra (in other words the normalized positive linear functionals $\omega$).
- The value $\omega (A)$ of a state $\omega$ on an element $A$ is the expectation value of the observable $A$ if the quantum system is in the state $\omega$.

=== Example ===
If the C*-algebra is the algebra of all bounded operators on a Hilbert space $\mathbb{H}$, then the bounded observables are just the bounded self-adjoint operators on $\mathbb{H}$. If $v$ is a unit vector of $\mathbb{H}$ then $\omega (A) = \langle v, A v \rangle$ is a state on the C*-algebra, meaning the unit vectors (up to scalar multiplication) give the states of the system. This is similar to Dirac's formulation of quantum mechanics, though Dirac also allowed unbounded operators, and did not distinguish clearly between self-adjoint and Hermitian operators.

== See also ==
- Quantum mechanics
- Schrödinger equation
- John von Neumann
- Axiomatic quantum field theory
