= List of things named after Werner Heisenberg =

The following is a list of things named after Werner Karl Heisenberg:

- Euler–Heisenberg Lagrangian
- Heisenberg commutation relation
- Heisenberg cut
- Heisenberg ferromagnet
- Heisenberg group
  - Heisenberg algebra
- Heisenberg–Langevin equations
- Heisenberg limit
- Heisenberg's microscope
- Heisenberg model (classical)
- Heisenberg model (quantum)
- Heisenberg picture
  - Heisenberg equation of motion
- Heisenberg uncertainty principle
- Kramers–Heisenberg formula

== Other ==
- Heisenberg affair, a political affair in the 1930s involving Heisenberg
- Heisenbug, in computer programming
- Werner Heisenberg Memorial Lecture
- Werner Heisenberg Gymnasium in Leverkusen, Germany
- Werner Heisenberg Gymnasium in Leipzig, Germany
- Heisenberg-Gesellschaft e.V., München, founded 2012
- Heisenberg Institute College in Bogotá, Colombia.

== In popular culture ==
- Heisenberg compensator, in the Star Trek fictional universe.
- The AMC television series Breaking Bad features a chemistry teacher turned drug producer, named Walter White, who uses the name "Heisenberg" as his pseudonym in tribute to the scientist.
- The Eyes of Heisenberg by Frank Herbert
- The Heisenberg Device, a version of the atomic bomb used by Nazi Germany in the alternate history T.V. series The Man in the High Castle.
- In the video game expansion The Sims 3: Into the Future, there is a Nanite (a collectible in-game item) called the Heisenberg Nanite.
- In the video game Resident Evil Village, there is a character named Karl Heisenberg who uses magnetic powers to antagonize the protagonist, Ethan Winters. Heisenberg also owns a factory, in which he conducts experiments and creates bioorganic weapons.
- Heisenberg is also a supporting character in the comic spinoff, Assassin's Creed: Conspiracies.
- Heisenberg is also one of the recurring characters of the comic, Quantonium, codenamed Wielder.
