= Update rule =

Update rule may refer to:

- Update rule in Bayesian inference
- Update rules I and II, that is the Born rule and the state update or collapse rule, in quantum mechanics
