= Interaction picture =

View of quantum mechanics

In quantum mechanics, the interaction picture (also known as the interaction representation or Dirac picture after Paul Dirac, who introduced it) is an intermediate representation between the Schrödinger picture and the Heisenberg picture. Whereas in the other two pictures either the state vector or the operators carry time dependence, in the interaction picture both carry part of the time dependence of observables. The interaction picture is useful in dealing with changes to the wave functions and observables due to interactions. Most field-theoretical calculations use the interaction representation because they construct the solution to the many-body Schrödinger equation as the solution to free particles in presence of some unknown interacting parts.

Equations that include operators acting at different times, which hold in the interaction picture, don't necessarily hold in the Schrödinger or the Heisenberg picture. This is because time-dependent unitary transformations relate operators in one picture to the analogous operators in the others.

The interaction picture is a special case of unitary transformation applied to the Hamiltonian and state vectors.

Haag's theorem says that the interaction picture doesn't exist in the case of interacting quantum fields.

== Definition ==
Operators and state vectors in the interaction picture are related by a change of basis (unitary transformation) to those same operators and state vectors in the Schrödinger picture.

To switch into the interaction picture, we divide the Schrödinger picture Hamiltonian into two parts:

$H_\text{S} = H_{0,\text{S}} + H_{1,\text{S}}.$

Any possible choice of parts will yield a valid interaction picture; but in order for the interaction picture to be useful in simplifying the analysis of a problem, the parts will typically be chosen so that H_{0,S} is well understood and exactly solvable, while H_{1,S} contains some harder-to-analyze perturbation to this system.

If the Hamiltonian has explicit time-dependence (for example, if the quantum system interacts with an applied external electric field that varies in time), it will usually be advantageous to include the explicitly time-dependent terms with H_{1,S}, leaving H_{0,S} time-independent:

$H_\text{S}(t) = H_{0,\text{S}} + H_{1,\text{S}}(t).$

We proceed assuming that this is the case. If there is a context in which it makes sense to have H_{0,S} be time-dependent, then one can proceed by replacing $\mathrm{e}^{\pm \mathrm{i} H_{0,\text{S}} t/\hbar}$ by the corresponding time-evolution operator in the definitions below.

=== State vectors ===
Let $|\psi_\text{S}(t)\rangle = \mathrm{e}^{-\mathrm{i}H_\text{S}t/\hbar}|\psi(0)\rangle$ be the time-dependent state vector in the Schrödinger picture. A state vector in the interaction picture, $|\psi_\text{I}(t)\rangle$, is defined with an additional time-dependent unitary transformation.

$| \psi_\text{I}(t) \rangle = \text{e}^{\mathrm{i} H_{0,\text{S}} t / \hbar} | \psi_\text{S}(t) \rangle.$

=== Operators ===
An operator in the interaction picture is defined as

$A_\text{I}(t) = \mathrm{e}^{\mathrm{i} H_{0,\text{S}} t / \hbar} A_\text{S}(t) \mathrm{e}^{-\mathrm{i} H_{0,\text{S}} t / \hbar}.$

Note that A_{S}(t) will typically not depend on t and can be rewritten as just A_{S}. It only depends on t if the operator has "explicit time dependence", for example, due to its dependence on an applied external time-varying electric field. Another instance of explicit time dependence may occur when A_{S}(t) is a density matrix (see below).

==== Hamiltonian operator ====
For the operator $H_0$ itself, the interaction picture and Schrödinger picture coincide:

$$H_{0,\text{I}}(t) = \mathrm{e}^{\mathrm{i} H_{0,\text{S}} t / \hbar} H_{0,\text{S}} \mathrm{e}^{-\mathrm{i} H_{0,\text{S}} t / \hbar} = H_{0,\text{S}}.$$

This is easily seen through the fact that operators commute with differentiable functions of themselves. This particular operator then can be called $H_0$ without ambiguity.

For the perturbation Hamiltonian $H_{1,\text{I}}$, however,

$$H_{1,\text{I}}(t) = \mathrm{e}^{\mathrm{i} H_{0,\text{S}} t / \hbar} H_{1,\text{S}} \mathrm{e}^{-\mathrm{i} H_{0,\text{S}} t / \hbar},$$

where the interaction-picture perturbation Hamiltonian becomes a time-dependent Hamiltonian, unless [H_{1,S}, H_{0,S}] = 0.

It is possible to obtain the interaction picture for a time-dependent Hamiltonian H_{0,S}(t) as well, but the exponentials need to be replaced by the unitary propagator for the evolution generated by H_{0,S}(t), or more explicitly with a time-ordered exponential integral.

==== Density matrix ====
The density matrix can be shown to transform to the interaction picture in the same way as any other operator. In particular, let ρ_{I} and ρ_{S} be the density matrices in the interaction picture and the Schrödinger picture respectively. If there is probability p_{n} to be in the physical state |ψ_{n}⟩, then

$$\begin{align}
\rho_\text{I}(t)
&= \sum_n p_n(t) \left|\psi_{n,\text{I}}(t)\right\rang \left\lang \psi_{n,\text{I}}(t)\right| \\
&= \sum_n p_n(t) \mathrm{e}^{\mathrm{i} H_{0,\text{S}} t / \hbar} \left|\psi_{n,\text{S}}(t)\right\rang \left\lang \psi_{n,\text{S}}(t)\right| \mathrm{e}^{-\mathrm{i} H_{0,\text{S}} t / \hbar} \\
&= \mathrm{e}^{\mathrm{i} H_{0,\text{S}} t / \hbar} \rho_\text{S}(t) \mathrm{e}^{-\mathrm{i} H_{0,\text{S}} t / \hbar}.
\end{align}$$

=== Time-evolution ===
==== Time-evolution of states ====
Transforming the Schrödinger equation into the interaction picture gives

$$\mathrm{i} \hbar \frac{\mathrm{d}}{\mathrm{d}t} |\psi_\text{I}(t)\rang = H_{1,\text{I}}(t) |\psi_\text{I}(t)\rang,$$

which states that in the interaction picture, a quantum state is evolved by the interaction part of the Hamiltonian as expressed in the interaction picture. A proof is given in Fetter and Walecka.

==== Time-evolution of operators ====
If the operator A_{S} is time-independent (i.e., does not have "explicit time dependence"; see above), then the corresponding time evolution for A_{I}(t) is given by

$$\mathrm{i}\hbar\frac{\mathrm{d}}{\mathrm{d}t}A_\text{I}(t) = [A_\text{I}(t),H_{0,\text{S}}].$$

In the interaction picture the operators evolve in time like the operators in the Heisenberg picture with the Hamiltonian H' = H_{0}.

==== Time-evolution of the density matrix ====
The evolution of the density matrix in the interaction picture is

$$\mathrm{i}\hbar \frac{\mathrm{d}}{\mathrm{d}t} \rho_\text{I}(t) = [H_{1,\text{I}}(t), \rho_\text{I}(t)],$$

in consistency with the Schrödinger equation in the interaction picture.

== Expectation values ==
For a general operator $A$, the expectation value in the interaction picture is given by

$$\langle A_\text{I}(t) \rangle =
\langle \psi_\text{I}(t) | A_\text{I}(t) | \psi_\text{I}(t) \rangle =
\langle \psi_\text{S}(t) | e^{-i H_{0,\text{S}} t/\hbar} e^{i H_{0,\text{S}} t/\hbar} \, A_\text{S} \, e^{-i H_{0,\text{S}} t/\hbar} e^{i H_{0,\text{S}} t/\hbar } | \psi_\text{S}(t) \rangle =
\langle A_\text{S}(t) \rangle.$$

Using the density-matrix expression for expectation value, we will get

$$\langle A_\text{I}(t) \rangle = \operatorname{Tr}\big(\rho_\text{I}(t) \, A_\text{I}(t)\big).$$

== Schwinger–Tomonaga equation ==
The term interaction representation was invented by Schwinger. In this new mixed representation the state vector is no longer constant in general, but it is constant if there is no coupling between fields. The change of representation leads directly to the Tomonaga–Schwinger equation:

$$ihc \frac {\partial  \Psi[\sigma]}{\partial \sigma(x)} = \hat{H}(x)\Psi(\sigma)$$
$$\hat{H}(x) = - \frac{1}{c} j_{\mu}(x) A^{\mu}(x)$$

Where the Hamiltonian in this case is the QED interaction Hamiltonian, but it can also be a generic interaction, and $\sigma$ is a spacelike surface that is passing through the point $x$. The derivative formally represents a variation over that surface given $x$ fixed. It is difficult to give a precise mathematical formal interpretation of this equation.

This approach is called the 'differential' and 'field' approach by Schwinger, as opposed to the 'integral' and 'particle' approach of the Feynman diagrams.

The core idea is that if the interaction has a small coupling constant (i.e. in the case of electromagnetism of the order of the fine structure constant) successive perturbative terms will be powers of the coupling constant and therefore smaller.

== Use ==
The purpose of the interaction picture is to shunt all the time dependence due to H_{0} onto the operators, thus allowing them to evolve freely, and leaving only H_{1,I} to control the time-evolution of the state vectors.

The interaction picture is convenient when considering the effect of a small interaction term, H_{1,S}, being added to the Hamiltonian of a solved system, H_{0,S}. By utilizing the interaction picture, one can use time-dependent perturbation theory to find the effect of H_{1,I}, e.g., in the derivation of Fermi's golden rule, or the Dyson series in quantum field theory: in 1947, Shin'ichirō Tomonaga and Julian Schwinger appreciated that covariant perturbation theory could be formulated elegantly in the interaction picture, since field operators can evolve in time as free fields, even in the presence of interactions, now treated perturbatively in such a Dyson series.

== Summary comparison of evolution in all pictures ==
For a time-independent Hamiltonian H_{S}, where H_{0,S} is the free Hamiltonian,

Evolution of:	Picture		
Evolution of:	Schrödinger (S)	Heisenberg (H)	Interaction (I)
Ket state	$| \psi_{\rm S}(t) \rang = e^{-i H_{\rm S} ~t / \hbar} | \psi_{\rm S}(0) \rang$	constant	$| \psi_{\rm I}(t) \rang = e^{i H_{0, \mathrm{S}} ~t / \hbar} | \psi_{\rm S}(t) \rang$
Observable	constant	$A_{\rm H} (t)=e^{i H_{\rm S}~ t / \hbar} A_{\rm S} e^{-i H_{\rm S}~ t / \hbar}$	$A_{\rm I} (t)=e^{i H_{0, \mathrm{S}} ~t / \hbar} A_{\rm S} e^{-i H_{0, \mathrm{S}}~ t / \hbar}$
Density matrix	$\rho_{\rm S} (t)= e^{-i H_{ \rm S} ~t / \hbar} \rho_{\rm S}(0) e^{i H_{\rm S}~ t / \hbar}$	constant	$\rho_{\rm I} (t)=e^{i H_{0, \mathrm{S}} ~t / \hbar} \rho_{\rm S} (t) e^{-i H_{0, \mathrm{S}}~ t / \hbar}$

== See also ==
- Bra–ket notation
- Schrödinger equation
- Haag's theorem
