= Unitary transformation (quantum mechanics) =

Important mathematical operations in quantum mechanics

In quantum mechanics, the Schrödinger equation describes how a system changes with time. It does this by relating changes in the state of the system to the energy in the system (given by an operator called the Hamiltonian). Therefore, once the Hamiltonian is known, the time dynamics are in principle known. All that remains is to plug the Hamiltonian into the Schrödinger equation and solve for the system state as a function of time.

Often, however, the Schrödinger equation is difficult to solve (even with a computer). Therefore, physicists have developed mathematical techniques to simplify these problems and clarify what is happening physically. One such technique is to apply a unitary transformation to the Hamiltonian. Doing so can result in a simplified version of the Schrödinger equation which nonetheless has the same solution as the original.

== Transformation ==
A unitary transformation (or frame change) can be expressed in terms of a time-dependent Hamiltonian $H(t)$ and unitary operator $U(t)$. Under this change, the Hamiltonian transforms as:

$$H \to UH{U^\dagger} + i\hbar\,{\dot{U}U^\dagger}
=: \breve{H} \quad \quad (0)$$.

The Schrödinger equation applies to the new Hamiltonian. Solutions to the untransformed and transformed equations are also related by $U$. Specifically, if the wave function $\psi(t)$ satisfies the original equation, then $U\psi(t)$ will satisfy the new equation.

=== Derivation ===
Recall that by the definition of a unitary matrix, $U^\dagger U = I$. Beginning with the Schrödinger equation,

$$\dot{\psi}=-\frac{i}{\hbar}H\psi$$,

we can therefore insert the identity $U^\dagger U=I$ at will. In particular, inserting it after $H/\hbar$ and also premultiplying both sides by $U$, we get

$$U\dot{\psi}=-\frac{i}{\hbar} \left(UHU^\dagger \right) U\psi\quad\quad (1)$$.

Next, note that by the product rule,

$$\frac{\mathrm{d}}{\mathrm{d}t}\left(U\psi\right)=\dot{U}\psi+U\dot{\psi}$$.

Inserting another $U^\dagger U$ and rearranging, we get

$$U\dot{\psi} =
\frac{\mathrm d}{\mathrm d t}\Big(U\psi\Big)
- \dot{U}U^\dagger U\psi \quad\quad(2)$$.

Finally, combining (1) and (2) above results in the desired transformation:

$$\frac{\mathrm d}{\mathrm d t}\Big(U \psi\Big) =
-\frac{i}{\hbar}\Big(UH{U^\dagger} + i\hbar\, \dot{U}{U^\dagger}\Big)
\Big(U\psi\Big) \quad\quad \left(3\right)$$.

If we adopt the notation $\breve{\psi} := U\psi$ to describe the transformed wave function, the equations can be written in a clearer form. For instance, $(3)$ can be rewritten as

$$\frac{\mathrm d}{\mathrm d t}\breve{\psi} =
-\frac{i}{\hbar} \breve{H}\breve{\psi}
\quad\quad \left(4\right)$$,

which can be rewritten in the form of the original Schrödinger equation,

$$\breve{H}\breve{\psi} =
i\hbar{\operatorname{d}\!\breve{\psi}\over\operatorname{d}\!t}.$$

The original wave function can be recovered as $\psi = U^{\dagger} \breve{\psi}$.

=== Relation to the interaction picture ===
Unitary transformations can be seen as a generalization of the interaction (Dirac) picture. In the latter approach, a Hamiltonian is broken into a time-independent part and a time-dependent part,

$$H(t)=H_0 + V(t) \quad \quad (a)$$.

In this case, the Schrödinger equation becomes

$\dot{\psi_I} = -\frac{i}{\hbar} \left(e^{iH_0 t/\hbar} V e^{-iH_0 t/\hbar}\right) \psi_I$, with $\psi_I = e^{i H_0 t/\hbar} \psi$.

The correspondence to a unitary transformation can be shown by choosing $U(t)=\exp\left[{+i H_0 t / \hbar}\right]$. As a result, ${U^\dagger}(t) = \exp \left[{-i H_{0} t}/\hbar\right].$

Using the notation from $(a)$ above, our transformed Hamiltonian becomes

$$\breve{H} = U\left[H_0 + V(t)\right]U^{\dagger} + i\hbar \dot{U}U^{\dagger}
\quad \quad (b)$$

First note that since $U$ is a function of $H_0$, the two must commute. Then

$$UH_0U^\dagger=H_0$$,

which takes care of the first term in the transformation in $(b)$, i.e. $\breve{H} = H_0 + UV(t)U^{\dagger} + i \hbar \dot{U}U^{\dagger}$. Next use the chain rule to calculate

$$\begin{align} i\hbar \dot{U}U^\dagger  & =
i\hbar \left({\operatorname{d}\!U\over\operatorname{d}\!t}\right) e^{-iH_{0} t/\hbar} \\
& = i\hbar \Big(iH_{0}/\hbar\Big) e^{+iH_{0} t/\hbar} e^{-iH_{0} t/\hbar} \\
& = i \hbar \left({i H_0}/\hbar \right) \\
& = -H_{0}, \\ \end{align}$$

which cancels with the other $H_0$. Evidently we are left with $\breve{H} = UVU^\dagger$, yielding $\dot{\psi_{I}} = -\frac{i}{\hbar} U V U^{\dagger} \psi_I$ as shown above.

When applying a general unitary transformation, however, it is not necessary that $H(t)$ be broken into parts, or even that $U(t)$ be a function of any part of the Hamiltonian.

== Examples ==
=== Rotating frame ===
Consider an atom with two states, ground state $|g\rangle$ and excited state $|e\rangle$. The atom has a Hamiltonian $H = \hbar\omega {|{e}\rangle \langle {e}|}$, where $\omega$ is the frequency of light associated with the ground-to-excited transition. Now suppose we illuminate the atom with a drive at frequency $\omega_d$ which couples the two states, and that the time-dependent driven Hamiltonian is

$$H/\hbar=\omega |e\rangle\langle e| + \Omega\ e^{i\omega_d t}|g\rangle\langle e| + \Omega^*\ e^{-i\omega_d t}|e\rangle\langle g|$$

for some complex drive strength $\Omega$. Because of the competing frequency scales ($\omega$, $\omega_d$, and $\Omega$), it is difficult to anticipate the effect of the drive (see driven harmonic motion).

Without a drive, the phase of $|e\rangle$ would oscillate relative to $|g\rangle$. In the Bloch sphere representation of a two-state system, this corresponds to rotation around the z-axis. Conceptually, we can remove this component of the dynamics by entering a rotating frame of reference defined by the unitary transformation $U=e^{i\omega t|e\rangle\langle e|}$. Under this transformation, the Hamiltonian becomes

$$H/\hbar\to \Omega\, e^{i(\omega_d-\omega)t} |g\rangle \langle e|
+ \Omega^*\, e^{i(\omega-\omega_d)t} |e\rangle \langle g|$$.

If the driving frequency is equal to the g-e transition's frequency, $\omega_d=\omega$, resonance will occur and then the equation above reduces to

$$\breve{H} / \hbar =
\Omega\ |g\rangle\langle e| + \Omega^*\ |e\rangle\langle g|$$.

From this it is apparent, even without getting into details, that the dynamics will involve an oscillation between the ground and excited states at frequency $\Omega$.

As another limiting case, suppose the drive is far off-resonant, $|\omega_d-\omega|\gg 0$. We can figure out the dynamics in that case without solving the Schrödinger equation directly. Suppose the system starts in the ground state $|g\rangle$. Initially, the Hamiltonian will populate some component of $|e\rangle$. A small time later, however, it will populate roughly the same amount of $|e\rangle$ but with completely different phase. Thus the effect of an off-resonant drive will tend to cancel itself out. This can also be expressed by saying that an off-resonant drive is rapidly rotating in the frame of the atom.

These concepts are illustrated in the table below, where the sphere represents the Bloch sphere, the arrow represents the state of the atom, and the hand represents the drive.

| | Lab frame | Rotating frame |
|---|---|---|
| Resonant drive | Resonant drive in the lab frame | Resonant drive in a frame rotating with the atom |
| Off-resonant drive | Off-resonant drive in the lab frame | Off-resonant drive in a frame rotating with the atom |

=== Displaced frame ===
The example above could also have been analyzed in the interaction picture. The following example, however, is more difficult to analyze without the general formulation of unitary transformations. Consider two harmonic oscillators, between which we would like to engineer a beam splitter interaction,

$$g\, ab^\dagger + g^*\, a^\dagger b$$.

This was achieved experimentally with two microwave cavity resonators serving as $a$ and $b$. Below, we sketch the analysis of a simplified version of this experiment.

In addition to the microwave cavities, the experiment also involved a transmon qubit, $c$, coupled to both modes. The qubit is driven simultaneously at two frequencies, $\omega_1$ and $\omega_2$, for which $\omega_1-\omega_2=\omega_a-\omega_b$.

$$H_\mathrm{drive}/\hbar=\Re\left[\epsilon_1e^{i\omega_1 t}+\epsilon_2 e^{i\omega_2 t}\right](c+c^\dagger).$$

In addition, there are many fourth-order terms coupling the modes, but most of them can be neglected. In this experiment, two such terms which will become important are

$$H_4/\hbar=g_4\Big(e^{i(\omega_b-\omega_a)t}ab^\dagger + \text{h.c.}\Big)c^\dagger c$$.

(H.c. is shorthand for the Hermitian conjugate.) We can apply a displacement transformation, $U=D(-\xi_1 e^{-i\omega_1 t}-\xi_2 e^{-i\omega_2 t})$, to mode $c$. For carefully chosen amplitudes, this transformation will cancel $H_\textrm{drive}$ while also displacing the ladder operator, $c\to c+\xi_1 e^{-i\omega_1 t}+\xi_2 e^{-i\omega_2 t}$. This leaves us with

$$H/\hbar = g_4\Big(e^{i(\omega_b-\omega_a)t}ab^\dagger + e^{i(\omega_a-\omega_b)t}a^\dagger b\big)(c^\dagger +\xi_1^* e^{i\omega_1t}+\xi_2^* e^{i\omega_2 t})(c +\xi_1 e^{-i\omega_1t}+\xi_2 e^{-i\omega_2 t})$$.

Expanding this expression and dropping the rapidly rotating terms, we are left with the desired Hamiltonian,

$$H/\hbar=g_4 \xi_1^*\xi_2 e^{i(\omega_b-\omega_a+\omega_1-\omega_2)t}\ ab^\dagger+\text{h.c.} = g\, ab^\dagger + g^*\, a^\dagger b$$.

=== Relation to the Baker–Campbell–Hausdorff formula ===
It is common for the operators involved in unitary transformations to be written as exponentials of operators, $U = e^X$, as seen above. Further, the operators in the exponentials commonly obey the relation $X^\dagger = -X$, so that the transform of an operator $Y$ is,$UYU^\dagger = e^XYe^{-X}$. By now introducing the iterator commutator,

$$[(X)^n,Y] \equiv \underbrace{[X,\dotsb[X,[X}_{n \text { times }}, Y]] \dotsb],\quad [(X)^0,Y] \equiv Y,$$

we can use a special result of the Baker-Campbell-Hausdorff formula to write this transformation compactly as,

$$e^X Y e^{-X} = \sum_{n=0}^{\infty} \frac{[(X)^n,Y]}{n!},$$

or, in long form for completeness,

$$e^{X}Y e^{-X} = Y+\left[X,Y\right]+\frac{1}{2!}[X,[X,Y]]+\frac{1}{3!}[X,[X,[X,Y]]]+\cdots.$$
