= Heisenberg–Langevin equations =

The Heisenberg–Langevin equations (named after Werner Heisenberg and Paul Langevin) are equations for open quantum systems. They are a specific case of quantum Langevin equations.

In the Heisenberg picture the time evolution of a quantum system is the operators themselves. The solution to the Heisenberg equation of motion determines the subsequent time evolution of the operators. The Heisenberg–Langevin equation is the generalization of this to open quantum systems.
