= Time evolution =

Change of state over time, especially in physics

Time evolution is the change of state brought about by the passage of time, applicable to systems with internal state (also called stateful systems). In this formulation, time is not required to be a continuous parameter, but may be discrete or even finite. In classical physics, time evolution of a collection of rigid bodies is governed by the principles of classical mechanics. In their most rudimentary form, these principles express the relationship between forces acting on the bodies and their acceleration given by Newton's laws of motion. These principles can be equivalently expressed more abstractly by Hamiltonian mechanics or Lagrangian mechanics.

The concept of time evolution may be applicable to other stateful systems as well. For instance, the operation of a Turing machine can be regarded as the time evolution of the machine's control state together with the state of the tape (or possibly multiple tapes) including the position of the machine's read-write head (or heads). In this case, time is considered to be discrete steps.

Stateful systems often have dual descriptions in terms of states or in terms of observable values. In such systems, time evolution can also refer to the change in observable values. This is particularly relevant in quantum mechanics where the Schrödinger picture and Heisenberg picture are (mostly) equivalent descriptions of time evolution.

== Time evolution operators ==
Consider a system with state space X for which evolution is deterministic and reversible. For concreteness let us also suppose time is a parameter that ranges over the set of real numbers R. Then time evolution is given by a family of bijective state transformations

$$(\operatorname{F}_{t, s} \colon X \rightarrow X)_{s, t \in \mathbb{R}}$$.

F_{t, s}(x) is the state of the system at time t, whose state at time s is x. The following identity holds

$$\operatorname{F}_{u, t} (\operatorname{F}_{t, s} (x)) = \operatorname{F}_{u, s}(x).$$

To see why this is true, suppose x ∈ X is the state at time s. Then by the definition of F, F_{t, s}(x) is the state of the system at time t and consequently applying the definition once more, F_{u, t}(F_{t, s}(x)) is the state at time u. But this is also F_{u, s}(x).

In some contexts in mathematical physics, the mappings F_{t, s} are called propagation operators or simply propagators. In classical mechanics, the propagators are functions that operate on the phase space of a physical system. In quantum mechanics, the propagators are usually unitary operators on a Hilbert space. The propagators can be expressed as time-ordered exponentials of the integrated Hamiltonian. The asymptotic properties of time evolution are given by the scattering matrix.

A state space with a distinguished propagator is also called a dynamical system.

To say time evolution is homogeneous means that

$\operatorname{F}_{u, t} = \operatorname{F}_{u - t,0}$ for all $u,t \in \mathbb{R}$.

In the case of a homogeneous system, the mappings G_{t} = F_{t,0} form a one-parameter group of transformations of X, that is

$$\operatorname{G}_{t+s} = \operatorname{G}_{t}\operatorname{G}_{s}.$$

For non-reversible systems, the propagation operators F_{t, s} are defined whenever t ≥ s and satisfy the propagation identity

$\operatorname{F}_{u, t} (\operatorname{F}_{t, s} (x)) = \operatorname{F}_{u, s}(x)$ for any $u \geq t \geq s$.

In the homogeneous case the propagators are exponentials of the Hamiltonian.

=== In quantum mechanics ===
In the Schrödinger picture, the Hamiltonian operator generates the time evolution of quantum states. If $\left| \psi (t) \right\rangle$ is the state of the system at time $t$, then

$$H \left| \psi (t) \right\rangle = i \hbar {\partial\over\partial t} \left| \psi (t) \right\rangle.$$

This is the Schrödinger equation.

==== Time-independent Hamiltonian ====
If $H$ is independent of time, then a state at some initial time ($t = 0$) can be expressed using the unitary time evolution operator $U(t)$ is the exponential operator as

$$\left| \psi (t) \right\rangle = U(t)\left| \psi (0) \right\rangle = e^{-iHt/\hbar} \left| \psi (0) \right\rangle,$$

or more generally, for some initial time $t_0$

$\left| \psi (t) \right\rangle = U(t, t_0)\left| \psi (t_0) \right\rangle = e^{-iH(t-t_0)/\hbar} \left| \psi (t_0) \right\rangle.$

== See also ==
- Arrow of time
- Time translation symmetry
- Hamiltonian system
- Propagator
- Time evolution operator
- Hamiltonian (control theory)
