= Haag's theorem =

Theorem in quantum mechanics

While working on the mathematical physics of an interacting, relativistic, quantum field theory, Rudolf Haag developed an argument against the existence of the interaction picture, a result now commonly known as Haag's theorem. Haag's original proof relied on the specific form of then-common field theories, but subsequently generalized by a number of authors, notably Dick Hall and Arthur Wightman, who concluded that no single, universal Hilbert space representation can describe both free and interacting fields. A generalization due to Michael C. Reed and Barry Simon applies to free neutral scalar fields of different masses, which implies that the interaction picture is always inconsistent, even in the case of a free field.

== Introduction ==
Traditionally, describing a quantum field theory requires describing a set of operators satisfying the canonical (anti)commutation relations, and a Hilbert space on which those operators act. Equivalently, one should give a representation of the free algebra on those operators, modulo the canonical commutation relations (the CCR/CAR algebra); in the latter perspective, the underlying algebra of operators is the same, but different field theories correspond to different (i.e., unitarily inequivalent) representations.

Philosophically, the action of the CCR algebra should be irreducible, for otherwise the theory can be written as the combined effects of two separate fields. That principle implies the existence of a cyclic vacuum state. Importantly, a vacuum uniquely determines the algebra representation, because it is cyclic.

Two different specifications of the vacuum are common: the minimum-energy eigenvector of the field Hamiltonian, or the state annihilated by the number operator a^{†}a. When these specifications describe different vectors, the vacuum is said to polarize, after the physical interpretation in the case of quantum electrodynamics.

Haag's result explains that the same quantum field theory must treat the vacuum very differently when interacting vs. free.

== Formal description ==
In its modern form, Haag's theorem has two parts:

1. If a quantum field is free and Euclidean-invariant in the spatial dimensions, then that field's vacuum does not polarize.
2. If two Poincaré-invariant quantum fields share the same vacuum, then their first four Wightman functions coincide. Moreover, if one such field is free, then the other must also be a free field of the same mass.

This state of affairs is in stark contrast to ordinary non-relativistic quantum mechanics, where there is always a unitary equivalence between the free and interacting representations. That fact is used in constructing the interaction picture, where operators are evolved using a free field representation, while states evolve using the interacting field representation. Within the formalism of quantum field theory (QFT) such a picture generally does not exist, because these two representations are unitarily inequivalent. Thus the quantum field theorist is confronted with the so-called choice problem: One must choose the 'right' representation among an uncountably-infinite set of representations which are not equivalent.

== Physical / heuristic point of view ==
As was already noticed by Haag in his original work, vacuum polarization lies at the core of Haag's theorem. Any interacting quantum field (or non-interacting fields of different masses) polarizes the vacuum, and as a consequence the vacuum state lies inside a renormalized Hilbert space $\;H_\text{renorm}\;$ that differs from the Hilbert space $\;H_\text{free}\;$ of the free field. Although an isomorphism could always be found that maps one Hilbert space into the other, Haag's theorem implies that no such mapping could deliver unitarily equivalent representations of the corresponding canonical commutation relations, i.e. unambiguous physical results.

== Work-arounds ==
Among the assumptions that lead to Haag's theorem is translation invariance of the system. Consequently, systems that can be set up inside a box with periodic boundary conditions or that interact with suitable external potentials escape the conclusions of the theorem.

Haag (1958) and David Ruelle (1962) have presented the Haag–Ruelle scattering theory, which deals with asymptotic free states and thereby serves to formalize some of the assumptions needed for the LSZ reduction formula. These techniques, however, cannot be applied to massless particles and have unsolved issues with bound states.

== Quantum field theorists' conflicting reactions ==
While some physicists and philosophers of physics have repeatedly emphasized how seriously Haag's theorem undermines the foundations of QFT, the majority of practicing quantum field theorists simply dismiss the issue. Most quantum field theory texts geared to practical appreciation of the Standard Model of elementary particle interactions do not even mention it, implicitly assuming that some rigorous set of definitions and procedures may be found to firm up the powerful and well-confirmed heuristic results they report on.

For example, asymptotic structure (cf. QCD jets) is a specific calculation in strong agreement with experiment, but nevertheless should fail by dint of Haag's theorem. The general feeling is that this is not some calculation that was merely stumbled upon, but rather that it embodies a physical truth. The practical calculations and tools are motivated and justified by an appeal to a grand mathematical formalism called QFT. Haag's theorem suggests that the formalism is not well-founded, yet the practical calculations are sufficiently distant from the abstract formalism that any weaknesses there do not affect (or invalidate) practical results.

As was pointed out by Teller (1997):

Everyone must agree that as a piece of mathematics Haag's theorem is a valid result that at least appears to call into question the mathematical foundation of interacting quantum field theory, and agree that at the same time the theory has proved astonishingly successful in application to experimental results.

Tracy Lupher (2005) suggested that the wide range of conflicting reactions to Haag's theorem may partly be caused by the fact that the same exists in different formulations, which in turn were proved within different formulations of QFT such as Wightman's axiomatic approach or the LSZ formula. According to Lupher,

The few who mention it tend to regard it as something important that someone (else) should investigate thoroughly.

Lawrence Sklar (2000) further pointed out:

There may be a presence within a theory of conceptual problems that appear to be the result of mathematical artifacts. These seem to the theoretician to be not fundamental problems rooted in some deep physical mistake in the theory, but, rather, the consequence of some misfortune in the way in which the theory has been expressed. Haag's theorem is, perhaps, a difficulty of this kind.

David Wallace (2011) has compared the merits of conventional QFT with those of algebraic quantum field theory (AQFT) and observed that

... algebraic quantum field theory has unitarily inequivalent representations even on spatially finite regions, but this lack of unitary equivalence only manifests itself with respect to expectation values on arbitrary small spacetime regions, and these are exactly those expectation values which don't convey real information about the world.

He justifies the latter claim with the insights gained from modern renormalization group theory, namely the fact that

... we can absorb all our ignorance of how the cutoff [i.e., the short-range cutoff required to carry out the renormalization procedure] is implemented, into the values of finitely many coefficients which can be measured empirically.

Concerning the consequences of Haag's theorem, Wallace's observation implies that since QFT does not attempt to predict fundamental parameters, such as particle masses or coupling constants, potentially harmful effects arising from unitarily non-equivalent representations remain absorbed inside the empirical values that stem from measurements of these parameters (at a given length scale) and that are readily imported into QFT. Thus they remain invisible to quantum field theorists, in practice.
