= Heisenberg picture =

Formulation of quantum mechanics

In physics, the Heisenberg picture or Heisenberg representation is a formulation (largely due to Werner Heisenberg in 1925) of quantum mechanics in which observables incorporate a dependency on time, but the states are time-independent. It stands in contrast to the Schrödinger picture in which observables are constant (as long as there is no external force) and the states evolve in time.

It further serves to define a third, hybrid picture, the interaction picture.

== Mathematical details ==
In the Heisenberg picture of quantum mechanics the state vectors |ψ⟩ do not change with time, while observables A satisfy

$\frac{d}{dt}A_\text{H}(t)=\frac{i}{\hbar}[H_\text{H}(t),A_\text{H}(t)]+\left( \frac{\partial A_\text{S}}{\partial t} \right)_\text{H} ,$

where "H" and "S" label observables in Heisenberg and Schrödinger picture respectively, H is the Hamiltonian and [·,·] denotes the commutator of two operators (in this case H and A). Taking expectation values automatically yields the Ehrenfest theorem, featured in the correspondence principle.

By the Stone–von Neumann theorem, the Heisenberg picture and the Schrödinger picture are unitarily equivalent, just a basis change in Hilbert space. In some sense, the Heisenberg picture is more natural and convenient than the equivalent Schrödinger picture, especially for relativistic theories. Lorentz invariance is manifest in the Heisenberg picture, since the state vectors do not single out the time or space.

This approach also has a more direct similarity to classical physics: by simply replacing the commutator over the reduced Planck constant above by the Poisson bracket, the Heisenberg equation reduces to an equation in Hamiltonian mechanics.

== Equivalence of Heisenberg's equation to the Schrödinger equation ==
For the sake of pedagogy, the Heisenberg picture is introduced here from the subsequent, but more familiar, Schrödinger picture.

According to Schrödinger's equation, the quantum state at time $t$ is $|\psi(t)\rangle = U(t) |\psi(0)\rangle$, where $U(t)=T e^{-\frac{i}{\hbar}\int_0^t ds H_{{\rm S}} (s)}$ is the time-evolution operator induced by a Hamiltonian $H_{\rm S}(t)$ that could depend on time, and $|\psi(0) \rangle$ is the initial state. $T$ refers to time-ordering, ħ is the reduced Planck constant, and i is the imaginary unit. Given an observable $A_{\rm S} (t)$ in the Schrödinger picture, which is a Hermitian linear operator that could also be time-dependent, in the state $|\psi(t)\rangle$, its expectation value is given by
$$\lang A \rang _t = \lang \psi (t) | A_{\rm S}(t) | \psi(t) \rang.$$

In the Heisenberg picture, the quantum state is assumed to remain constant at its initial value $|\psi(0) \rangle$, whereas operators evolve with time according to the definition
$$A_{\rm H} (t) := U^{\dagger}(t) A_{\rm S} (t) U(t) \, .$$
This readily implies $\langle A \rangle_t =\langle \psi(0) | A_{\rm H}(t) | \psi(0) \rangle$, so the same expectation value can be obtained by working in either picture. The Schrödinger equation for the time-evolution operator is
$$\frac{d}{dt} U(t) = -\frac{i}{\hbar} H_{\rm S}(t) U(t) .$$
It follows that
$$\begin{align}
\frac{d}{dt} A_{\rm H} (t) &=  \left( \frac{d}{dt} U^\dagger (t) \right) A_{\rm S}(t) U(t) + U^\dagger(t) A_{\rm S} (t)  \left( \frac{d}{dt} U (t) \right) + U^\dagger (t) \left(\frac{\partial A_{\rm S}} {\partial t}\right) U(t) \\
& = \frac{i}{\hbar} U^{\dagger}(t) H_{\rm S}(t) A_{{\rm S}} (t) U(t)  - \frac{i}{\hbar} U^{\dagger}(t) A_{\rm S}(t) H_{\rm S} (t) U(t) + U^{\dagger}(t) \left(\frac{\partial A_{\rm S}}{\partial t}\right) U(t)\\
& = \frac{i}{\hbar} U^{\dagger}(t) H_{\rm S} (t) U(t) U^\dagger(t) A_{\rm S}(t) U(t) - \frac{i}{\hbar} U^{\dagger}(t) A_{\rm S} (t) U(t) U^\dagger(t) H_{\rm S}(t) U(t) + \left(\frac{\partial A_{\rm S} }{\partial t}\right)_{\rm H}\\
& = \frac{i}{\hbar} [H_{\rm H}(t), A_{\rm H} (t)] + \left(\frac{\partial A_{\rm S}}{\partial t} \right) _{\rm H} ,
\end{align}$$
where differentiation was carried out according to the product rule. This is Heisenberg's equation of motion. Note that the Hamiltonian that appears in the final line above is the Heisenberg Hamiltonian $H_{\rm H}(t)$, which may differ from the Schrödinger Hamiltonian $H_{\rm S} (t)$.

An important special case of the equation above is obtained if the Hamiltonian $H_{\rm S}$ does not vary with time. Then the time-evolution operator can be written as
$$U(t) = e^{-\frac{i} {\hbar} t H_{\rm S}} ,$$
and hence $H_{\rm H} \equiv H_{\rm S}\equiv H$ since $U(t)$ now commutes with $H$. Therefore,
$$\lang A \rang _t = \lang \psi (0) | e^{\frac i \hbar t H} A_{{\rm S}} (t) e^{-\frac i \hbar t H} | \psi(0) \rang$$
and following the previous analyses,
$$\begin{align}
\frac{d}{dt} A_{\rm H}(t)
& = \frac{i}{\hbar} [H,A_{\rm H}(t)]+ e^{\frac i \hbar t H}\left(\frac{\partial A_{\rm S}}{ \partial t} \right) e^{-\frac i \hbar t H}.
\end{align}$$

Furthermore, if $A_{{\rm S}} \equiv A$ is also time-independent, then the last term vanishes and
$$\frac {d}{dt} A_{\rm H}(t)=\frac {i}{\hbar} [H, A_{\rm H} (t)] ,$$
where $A_{{\rm H}}(t) \equiv A(t)= e^{\frac {i} {\hbar} t H} A e^{- \frac {i} {\hbar} t H}$ in this particular case. The equation is solved by use of the standard operator identity,
$${e^B A e^{-B}} = A + [B,A] + \frac{1}{2!} [B,[B,A]] + \frac{1}{3!}[B,[B,[B,A]]] + \cdots\, ,$$
which implies
$$A(t) = A + \frac{i t}{\hbar}[H,A] + \frac{1}{2!}\left(\frac{i t}{\hbar}\right)^2 [H,[H,A]] + \frac{1}{3!} \left(\frac{i t}{\hbar}\right)^3 [H,[H,[H,A]]] + \cdots$$

A similar relation also holds for classical mechanics, the classical limit of the above, given by the correspondence between Poisson brackets and commutators:
$$\frac{[A,H]}{\hbar} \quad \longleftrightarrow \quad i\{A,H\}.$$
In classical mechanics, for an A with no explicit time dependence,
$$\{A,H\} = \frac{dA}{dt}~,$$
so again the expression for A(t) is the Taylor expansion around t = 0.

In effect, the initial state of the quantum system has receded from view, and is only considered at the final step of taking specific expectation values or matrix elements of observables that evolved in time according to the Heisenberg equation of motion. A similar analysis applies if the initial state is mixed.

The time evolved state $|\psi(t)\rangle$ in the Schrödinger picture is sometimes written as $|\psi_{\rm S}(t)\rangle$ to differentiate it from the evolved state $|\psi_{\rm I}(t)\rangle$ that appears in the different interaction picture.

== Commutator relations ==
Commutator relations may look different than in the Schrödinger picture, because of the time dependence of operators. For example, consider the operators x(t_{1}), x(t_{2}), p(t_{1}) and p(t_{2}). The time evolution of those operators depends on the Hamiltonian of the system. Considering the one-dimensional harmonic oscillator,
$$H = \frac{p^2}{2m} + \frac{m\omega^2 x^2}{2} ,$$
the evolution of the position and momentum operators is given by:
$$\frac{d}{dt} x(t) = \frac{i}{\hbar} [ H , x(t) ] = \frac {p}{m},$$
$$\frac{d}{dt} p(t) = \frac{i}{\hbar} [ H , p(t) ] = -m \omega^2 x .$$

Note that the Hamiltonian is time independent and hence x(t) and p(t) are the position and momentum operators in the Heisenberg picture. Differentiating both equations once more and solving for them with proper initial conditions,
$$\dot{p}(0) = -m \omega^2 x_0 ,$$
$$\dot{x}(0) = \frac{p_0}{m} ,$$
leads to
$$x(t) = x_0 \cos(\omega t) + \frac{p_0}{\omega m}\sin(\omega t) ,$$
$$p(t) = p_0 \cos(\omega t) - m \omega x_0 \sin(\omega t) .$$

Direct computation yields the more general commutator relations,
$$[x(t_1), x(t_2)] = \frac{i\hbar}{m\omega} \sin\left(\omega t_2 - \omega t_1\right) ,$$
$$[p(t_1), p(t_2)] = i\hbar m\omega \sin\left(\omega t_2 - \omega t_1\right) ,$$
$$[x(t_1), p(t_2)] = i\hbar \cos\left(\omega t_2 - \omega t_1\right) .$$

For $t_1 = t_2$, one simply recovers the standard canonical commutation relations valid in all pictures.

== Summary comparison of evolution in all pictures ==
For a time-independent Hamiltonian H_{S}, where H_{0,S} is the free Hamiltonian,

Evolution of:	Picture		
Evolution of:	Schrödinger (S)	Heisenberg (H)	Interaction (I)
Ket state	$| \psi_{\rm S}(t) \rang = e^{-i H_{\rm S} ~t / \hbar} | \psi_{\rm S}(0) \rang$	constant	$| \psi_{\rm I}(t) \rang = e^{i H_{0, \mathrm{S}} ~t / \hbar} | \psi_{\rm S}(t) \rang$
Observable	constant	$A_{\rm H} (t)=e^{i H_{\rm S}~ t / \hbar} A_{\rm S} e^{-i H_{\rm S}~ t / \hbar}$	$A_{\rm I} (t)=e^{i H_{0, \mathrm{S}} ~t / \hbar} A_{\rm S} e^{-i H_{0, \mathrm{S}}~ t / \hbar}$
Density matrix	$\rho_{\rm S} (t)= e^{-i H_{ \rm S} ~t / \hbar} \rho_{\rm S}(0) e^{i H_{\rm S}~ t / \hbar}$	constant	$\rho_{\rm I} (t)=e^{i H_{0, \mathrm{S}} ~t / \hbar} \rho_{\rm S} (t) e^{-i H_{0, \mathrm{S}}~ t / \hbar}$

== See also ==
- Bra–ket notation
- Interaction picture
- Schrödinger picture
- Heisenberg–Langevin equations
- Phase space formulation
