= Observable =

Any entity that can be measured

In physics, an observable is a physical property or physical quantity that can be measured. In classical mechanics, an observable is a real-valued "function" on the set of all possible system states, e.g., position and momentum. In quantum mechanics, an observable is described by a linear operator. For example, these operators might represent submitting the system to various electromagnetic fields and eventually reading a value.

Physically meaningful observables must also satisfy transformation laws that relate observations performed by different observers in different frames of reference. These transformation laws are automorphisms of the state space, that is bijective transformations that preserve certain mathematical properties of the space in question.

== Quantum mechanics ==
Every observable quantity in a quantum system is represented by a linear operator. John Archibald Wheeler used the analogy of a machine to describe operators: a quantum state goes in to the machine and the result state comes out. The result state will be one of the eigenstates of the operator. If the input was an eigenstate, the output will also be that eigenstate. In all other cases the output will be non-deterministic: one of the eigenstates will result with a probability depending on the operator and input.

In quantum mechanics, observables correspond to linear self-adjoint operators on a separable complex Hilbert space representing the quantum state space. Observables assign values to outcomes of particular measurements, corresponding to the eigenvalue of the operator. If these outcomes represent physically allowable states (i.e. those that belong to the Hilbert space) the eigenvalues are real; however, the converse is not necessarily true. As a consequence, only certain measurements can determine the value of an observable for some state of a quantum system. In classical mechanics, any measurement can be made to determine the value of an observable.

The relation between the state of a quantum system and the value of an observable requires some linear algebra for its description. In the mathematical formulation of quantum mechanics, up to a phase constant, pure states are given by non-zero vectors in a Hilbert space V. Two vectors v and w are considered to specify the same state if and only if $\mathbf{w} = c\mathbf{v}$ for some non-zero $c \in \Complex$. Observables are given by self-adjoint operators on V. Not every self-adjoint operator corresponds to a physically meaningful observable. Also, not all physical observables are associated with non-trivial self-adjoint operators. For example, in quantum theory, mass appears as a parameter in the Hamiltonian, not as a non-trivial operator.

In the case of transformation laws in quantum mechanics, the requisite automorphisms are unitary (or antiunitary) linear transformations of the Hilbert space V. Under Galilean relativity or special relativity, the mathematics of frames of reference is particularly simple, considerably restricting the set of physically meaningful observables.

In quantum mechanics, measurement of observables exhibits some seemingly unintuitive properties. Specifically, if a system is in a state described by a vector in a Hilbert space, the measurement process affects the state in a non-deterministic but statistically predictable way. In particular, after a measurement is applied, the state description by a single vector may be destroyed, being replaced by a statistical ensemble. The irreversible nature of measurement operations in quantum physics is sometimes referred to as the measurement problem and is described mathematically by quantum operations. By the structure of quantum operations, this description is mathematically equivalent to that offered by the relative state interpretation where the original system is regarded as a subsystem of a larger system and the state of the original system is given by the partial trace of the state of the larger system.

In quantum mechanics, dynamical variables $A$ such as position, translational (linear) momentum, orbital angular momentum, spin, and total angular momentum are each associated with a self-adjoint operator $\hat{A}$ that acts on the state of the quantum system. The eigenvalues of operator $\hat{A}$ correspond to the possible values that the dynamical variable can be observed as having. For example, suppose $|\psi_{a}\rangle$ is an eigenket (eigenvector) of the observable $\hat{A}$, with eigenvalue $a$, and exists in a Hilbert space. Then
$$\hat{A}|\psi_a\rangle = a|\psi_a\rangle.$$

This eigenket equation says that if a measurement of the observable $\hat{A}$ is made while the system of interest is in the state $|\psi_a\rangle$, then the observed value of that particular measurement must return the eigenvalue $a$ with certainty. However, if the system of interest is in the general state $|\phi\rangle \in \mathcal{H}$ (and $|\phi\rangle$ and $|\psi_a\rangle$ are unit vectors, and the eigenspace of $a$ is one-dimensional), then the eigenvalue $a$ is returned with probability $|\langle \psi_a|\phi\rangle|^2$, by the Born rule.

=== Compatible and incompatible observables in quantum mechanics ===
A crucial difference between classical quantities and quantum mechanical observables is that some pairs of quantum observables may not be simultaneously measurable, a property referred to as complementarity. This is mathematically expressed by non-commutativity of their corresponding operators, to the effect that the commutator
$$\left[\hat{A}, \hat{B}\right] := \hat{A}\hat{B} - \hat{B}\hat{A} \neq \hat{0}.$$

This inequality expresses a dependence of measurement results on the order in which measurements of observables $\hat{A}$ and $\hat{B}$ are performed. A measurement of $\hat{A}$ alters the quantum state in a way that is incompatible with the subsequent measurement of $\hat{B}$ and vice versa.

Observables corresponding to commuting operators are called compatible observables. For example, momentum along say the $x$ and $y$ axes are compatible. Observables corresponding to non-commuting operators are called incompatible observables or complementary variables. For example, the position and momentum along the same axis are incompatible.

Incompatible observables cannot have a complete set of common eigenfunctions. Note that there can be some simultaneous eigenvectors of $\hat{A}$ and $\hat{B}$, but not enough in number to constitute a complete basis.

== See also ==
- Control theory
- Eigenvalue
- Expectation value
- Measure (mathematics)
- Measurement
- Observable universe
- Observer (quantum physics)
- Physical quantity
- Quantum state
- Statistical variable
- Table of QM operators
- Unobservable
