= Dyson series =

Expansion of the time evolution operator

In scattering theory, a part of mathematical physics, the Dyson series, formulated by Freeman Dyson, is a perturbative expansion of the time evolution operator in the interaction picture. Each term in the expansion can be represented by a sum of Feynman diagrams.

This series diverges asymptotically, but in quantum electrodynamics (QED) at the second order the difference from experimental data is in the order of 10^{−10}. This close agreement holds because the coupling constant (also known as the fine-structure constant) of QED is much less than 1.

== Dyson operator ==
In the interaction picture, a Hamiltonian H, can be split into a free part H_{0} and an interacting part V_{S}(t) as H = H_{0} + V_{S}(t).

The potential in the interacting picture is

$$V_{\mathrm I}(t) = \mathrm{e}^{\mathrm{i} H_{0}(t - t_{0})/\hbar} V_{\mathrm S}(t) \mathrm{e}^{-\mathrm{i} H_{0} (t - t_{0})/\hbar},$$

where $H_0$ is time-independent and $V_{\mathrm S}(t)$ is the possibly time-dependent interacting part of the Schrödinger picture. To avoid subscripts, $V(t)$ stands for $V_\mathrm{I}(t)$ in what follows.

In the interaction picture, the evolution operator U is defined by the equation:

$$\Psi(t) = U(t,t_0) \Psi(t_0)$$

This is sometimes called the Dyson operator.

The evolution operator forms a unitary group with respect to the time parameter. It has the group properties:

- Identity and normalization: $U(t,t) = 1,$
- Composition: $U(t,t_0) = U(t,t_1) U(t_1,t_0),$
- Time Reversal: $U^{-1}(t,t_0) = U(t_0,t),$
- Unitarity: $U^{\dagger}(t,t_0) U(t,t_0)=\mathbb{1}$

and from these is possible to derive the time evolution equation of the propagator:

$$i\hbar\frac d{dt} U(t,t_0)\Psi(t_0) = V(t) U(t,t_0)\Psi(t_0).$$

In the interaction picture, the Hamiltonian is the same as the interaction potential $H_{\rm int}=V(t)$ and thus the equation can also be written in the interaction picture as

$$i\hbar \frac d{dt} \Psi(t) = H_{\rm int}\Psi(t)$$

Caution: this time evolution equation is not to be confused with the Tomonaga–Schwinger equation.

The formal solution is

$$U(t,t_0)=1 - i\hbar^{-1} \int_{t_0}^t{dt_1\ V(t_1)U(t_1,t_0)},$$

which is ultimately a type of Volterra integral.

== Derivation of the Dyson series ==
An iterative solution of the Volterra equation above leads to the following Neumann series:

$$\begin{align}
U(t,t_0) = {} & 1 - i\hbar^{-1} \int_{t_0}^t dt_1V(t_1) + (-i\hbar^{-1})^2\int_{t_0}^t dt_1 \int_{t_0}^{t_1} \, dt_2 V(t_1)V(t_2)+\cdots \\
& {} + (-i\hbar^{-1})^n\int_{t_0}^t dt_1\int_{t_0}^{t_1} dt_2 \cdots \int_{t_0}^{t_{n-1}} dt_nV(t_1)V(t_2) \cdots V(t_n) +\cdots.
\end{align}$$

Here, $t_1 > t_2 > \cdots > t_n$, and so the fields are time-ordered. It is useful to introduce an operator $\mathcal T$, called the time-ordering operator, and to define

$$U_n(t,t_0)=(-i\hbar^{-1} )^n \int_{t_0}^t dt_1 \int_{t_0}^{t_1} dt_2 \cdots \int_{t_0}^{t_{n-1}} dt_n\,\mathcal TV(t_1) V(t_2)\cdots V(t_n).$$

The limits of the integration can be simplified. In general, given some symmetric function $K(t_1, t_2,\dots,t_n),$ one may define the integrals

$$S_n=\int_{t_0}^t dt_1\int_{t_0}^{t_1} dt_2\cdots \int_{t_0}^{t_{n-1}} dt_n \, K(t_1, t_2,\dots,t_n).$$

and

$$I_n=\int_{t_0}^t dt_1\int_{t_0}^t dt_2\cdots\int_{t_0}^t dt_nK(t_1, t_2,\dots,t_n).$$

The region of integration of the second integral can be broken in $n!$ sub-regions, defined by $t_1 > t_2 > \cdots > t_n$. Due to the symmetry of $K$, the integral in each of these sub-regions is the same and equal to $S_n$ by definition. It follows that

$$S_n = \frac{1}{n!}I_n.$$

Applied to the previous identity, this gives

$$U_n=\frac{(-i \hbar^{-1})^n}{n!}\int_{t_0}^t dt_1\int_{t_0}^t dt_2\cdots\int_{t_0}^t dt_n \, \mathcal TV(t_1)V(t_2)\cdots V(t_n).$$

Summing up all the terms, the Dyson series is obtained. It is a simplified version of the Neumann series above and which includes the time ordered products; it is the path-ordered exponential:

$$\begin{align}
U(t,t_0)&=\sum_{n=0}^\infty U_n(t,t_0)\\
&=\sum_{n=0}^\infty \frac{(-i\hbar^{-1})^n}{n!}\int_{t_0}^t dt_1\int_{t_0}^t dt_2\cdots\int_{t_0}^t dt_n \, \mathcal TV(t_1)V(t_2)\cdots V(t_n) \\
&=\mathcal T\exp{-i\hbar^{-1}\int_{t_0}^t{d\tau V(\tau)}}
\end{align}$$

This result is also called Dyson's formula. The group laws can be derived from this formula.

== Application on state vectors ==
The state vector at time $t$ can be expressed in terms of the state vector at time $t_0$, for $t>t_0,$ as

$$|\Psi(t)\rangle=\sum_{n=0}^\infty {(-i\hbar^{-1})^n\over n!}\underbrace{\int dt_1 \cdots dt_n}_{t\,\ge\, t_1\,\ge\, \cdots\, \ge\, t_n\,\ge\, t_0}\, \mathcal{T}\left\{\prod_{k=1}^n e^{iH_0 (t_k-t_0)/\hbar}V_{\rm S}(t_{k})e^{-iH_0 (t_k-t_0)/\hbar}\right \}|\Psi(t_0)\rangle.$$

The inner product of an initial state at $t_i=t_0$ with a final state at $t_f=t$ in the Schrödinger picture, for $t_f>t_i$ is:

$$\begin{align}
\langle\Psi(t_{\rm i}) & \mid\Psi(t_{\rm f})\rangle=\sum_{n=0}^\infty {(-i\hbar^{-1})^n\over n!} \times \\
&\underbrace{\int dt_1 \cdots dt_n}_{t_{\rm f}\,\ge\, t_1\,\ge\, \cdots\, \ge\, t_n\,\ge\, t_{\rm i}}\, \langle\Psi(t_i)\mid e^{iH_0(t_1-t_i)/\hbar}V_{\rm S}(t_1)e^{-iH_0(t_1-t_2)/\hbar}\cdots V_{\rm S}(t_n) e^{-iH_0(t_n-t_{\rm i})/\hbar}\mid\Psi(t_i)\rangle
\end{align}$$

The S-matrix may be obtained by writing this in the Heisenberg picture, taking the in and out states to be at infinity:

$$\langle\Psi_{\rm out} \mid S\mid\Psi_{\rm in}\rangle= \langle\Psi_{\rm out}\mid\sum_{n=0}^\infty {(-i\hbar^{-1})^n\over n!} \underbrace{\int d^4x_1 \cdots d^4x_n}_{t_{\rm out}\,\ge\, t_n\,\ge\, \cdots\, \ge\, t_1\,\ge\, t_{\rm in}}\, \mathcal{T}\left\{ H_{\rm int}(x_1)H_{\rm int}(x_2)\cdots H_{\rm int}(x_n) \right\}\mid\Psi_{\rm in}\rangle.$$

Note that the time ordering was reversed in the scalar product.

== See also ==
- Schwinger–Dyson equation
- Magnus series
- Peano–Baker series
- Picard iteration
