= Product integral =

Integral using products instead of sums

A product integral is any product-based counterpart of the usual sum-based integral of calculus. The product integral was developed by the mathematician Vito Volterra in 1887 to solve systems of linear differential equations.

== Informal sketch ==
The classical Riemann integral of a function $f:[a,b]\to\mathbb{R}$ can be defined by the relation
$$\int_a^b f(x)\,dx = \lim_{\Delta x\to 0}\sum f(x_i)\,\Delta x,$$
where the limit is taken over all partitions of the interval $[a,b]$ whose norms approach zero. Product integrals are similar, but take the limit of a product instead of the limit of a sum. They can be thought of as "continuous" versions of "discrete" products. They are defined as
$$\prod_a^b \big(1 + f(x)\,dx\big) = \lim_{\Delta x \to 0} \prod \big(1 + f(x_i)\,\Delta x\big).$$

For the case of $f:[a,b]\to\R$, the product integral reduces exactly to the case of Lebesgue integration, that is, to classical calculus. Thus, the interesting cases arise for functions $f:[a,b]\to A$ where $A$ is either some commutative algebra, such as a finite-dimensional matrix field, or if $A$ is a non-commutative algebra. The theories for these two cases, the commutative and non-commutative cases, have little in common. The non-commutative case is far more complicated; it requires proper path-ordering to make the integral well-defined.

=== Commutative case ===
For the commutative case, three distinct definitions are commonplace in the literature, referred to as Type-I, Type-II or geometric, and type-III or bigeometric. Such integrals have found use in epidemiology (the Kaplan–Meier estimator) and stochastic population dynamics. The geometric integral, together with the geometric derivative, is useful in image analysis and in the study of growth/decay phenomena (e.g., in economic growth, bacterial growth, and radioactive decay). The bigeometric integral, together with the bigeometric derivative, is useful in some applications of fractals, and in the theory of elasticity in economics.

=== Non-commutative case ===
The non-commutative case commonly arises in quantum mechanics and quantum field theory. The integrand is generally an operator belonging to some non-commutative algebra. In this case, one must be careful to establish a path-ordering while integrating. A typical result is the ordered exponential. The Magnus expansion provides one technique for computing the Volterra integral. Examples include the Dyson expansion, the integrals that occur in the operator product expansion and the Wilson line, a product integral over a gauge field. The Wilson loop is the trace of a Wilson line. The product integral also occurs in control theory, as the Peano–Baker series describing state transitions in linear systems written in a master equation type form.

== General (non-commutative) case ==
The Volterra product integral is most useful when applied to matrix-valued functions or functions with values in a Banach algebra. When applied to scalars belonging to a non-commutative field, to matrixes, and to operators, i.e. to mathematical objects that do not commute, the Volterra integral splits in two definitions.

The left product integral is
$$P(A,D)=\prod_{i=m}^{1}(\mathbb{1}+A(\xi_i)\Delta t_i) = (\mathbb{1}+A(\xi_m)\Delta t_m) \cdots (\mathbb{1}+A(\xi_1)\Delta t_1).$$
With this notation of left products (i.e. normal products applied from left),
$$\prod_a^b (\mathbb{1}+A(t)dt)=\lim_{\max \Delta t_i \to 0} P(A,D).$$

The right product integral is
$$P(A,D)^*=\prod_{i=1}^{m}(\mathbb{1}+A(\xi_i)\Delta t_i) = (\mathbb{1}+A(\xi_1)\Delta t_1) \cdots (\mathbb{1}+A(\xi_m)\Delta t_m).$$
With this notation of right products (i.e. applied from right),
$$(\mathbb{1}+A(t)dt) \prod_a^b =\lim_{\max \Delta t_i \to 0} P(A,D)^*,$$
where $\mathbb{1}$ is the identity matrix and $D$ is a partition of the interval $[a,b]$ in the Riemann sense, i.e. the limit is over the maximum interval in the partition. Note how in this case time ordering becomes evident in the definitions.

The Magnus expansion provides a technique for computing the product integral. It defines a continuous-time version of the Baker–Campbell–Hausdorff formula.

The product integral satisfies a collection of properties defining a one-parameter continuous group; these are stated in two articles showing applications: the Dyson series and the Peano–Baker series.

== Commutative case ==
The commutative case is vastly simpler, and, as a result, a large variety of distinct notations and definitions have appeared. Three distinct styles are popular in the literature. This subsection adopts the product $\textstyle \prod$ notation for product integration instead of the integral $\textstyle \int$ (usually modified by a superimposed times symbol or letter 'P') favoured by Volterra and others. An arbitrary classification of types is adopted to impose some order in the field.

When the function to be integrated is valued in the real numbers, then the theory reduces exactly to the theory of Lebesgue integration.

=== Type I: Volterra integral ===
The type I product integral corresponds to Volterra's original definition. The following relationship exists for scalar functions $f:[a,b] \to \mathbb{R}$:
$$\prod_a^b \big(1 + f(x)\,dx\big) = \exp\left(\int_a^b f(x) \,dx\right).$$

=== Type II: Geometric integral ===
$$\prod_a^b f(x)^{dx} = \lim_{\Delta x \to 0} \prod{f(x_i)^{\Delta x}} = \exp\left(\int_a^b \ln f(x) \,dx\right),$$
which is called the geometric integral. The logarithm is well-defined if $f$ takes values in the real or complex numbers, or if $f$ takes values in a commutative field of commuting trace-class operators. This definition of the product integral is the continuous analog of the discrete product operator $\textstyle \prod_{i=a}^b$ (with $i, a, b \in \mathbb{Z}$) and the multiplicative analog to the (normal/standard/additive) integral $\textstyle \int_a^b dx$ (with $x \in [a,b]$):

Discrete and continuous additive and multiplicative operators
Type	additive	multiplicative
discrete	$\sum_{i=a}^b f(i)$	$\prod_{i=a}^b f(i)$
continuous	$\int_a^b f(x)\,dx$	$\prod_a^b f(x)^{dx}$

It is very useful in stochastics, where the log-likelihood (i.e. the logarithm of a product integral of independent random variables) equals the integral of the logarithm of these (infinitesimally many) random variables:
$$\ln \prod_a^b p(x)^{dx} = \int_a^b \ln p(x) \,dx.$$

=== Type III: Bigeometric integral ===
$$\prod_a^b f(x)^{d(\ln x)} = \exp\left(\int_{\ln(a)}^{\ln(b)} \ln f(e^x) \,dx\right),$$
The type III product integral is called the bigeometric integral.

=== Basic results ===
For the commutative case, the following results hold for the type II product integral (the geometric integral).
$$\begin{align}
\prod_a^b c^{dx} &= c^{b-a}, \\
\prod_a^b x^{dx} &= \frac{b^b}{a^a} {\rm e}^{a-b}, \\
\prod_0^b x^{dx} &= b^b {\rm e}^{-b},
\end{align}$$
$$\begin{align}
\prod_a^b \left(f(x)^k\right)^{dx} &= \left(\prod_a^b f(x)^{dx}\right)^k, \\
\prod_a^b \left(c^{f(x)}\right)^{dx} &= c^{\int_a^b f(x) \,dx}.
\end{align}$$

The geometric integral (type II above) plays a central role in the geometric calculus, which is a multiplicative calculus. The inverse of the geometric integral, which is the geometric derivative, denoted $f^*(x)$, is defined using the following relationship:
$$f^*(x)=\exp\left(\frac{f'(x)}{f(x)}\right).$$

For $X$ is a random variable with probability distribution $F(x)$, the following can be concluded:

Fundamental theorem of calculus

$$\prod_a^b f^*(x)^{dx} = \prod_a^b \exp\left(\frac{f'(x)}{f(x)} \,dx\right) = \frac{f(b)}{f(a)},$$

Product rule

$$(fg)^* = f^* g^*.$$

Quotient rule

$$(f/g)^* = f^*/g^*.$$

Law of large numbers

$$\sqrt[n]{X_1 X_2 \cdots X_n} \underset{n \to \infty}{\longrightarrow} \prod_x X^{dF(x)}.$$

Compare with the standard law of large numbers:
$$\frac{X_1 + X_2 + \cdots + X_n}{n} \underset{n \to \infty}{\longrightarrow} \int X \,dF(x).$$

== Commutative case: Lebesgue-type product-integrals ==
When the integrand takes values in the real numbers, then the product intervals become easy to work with by using simple functions. Just as in the case of Lebesgue version of (classical) integrals, one can compute product integrals by approximating them with the product integrals of simple functions. The case of Type II geometric integrals reduces to exactly the case of classical Lebesgue integration.

=== Type I: Volterra integral ===
Because simple functions generalize step functions, in what follows we will only consider the special case of simple functions that are step functions. This will also make it easier to compare the Lebesgue definition with the Riemann definition.

Given a step function $f: [a,b] \to \mathbb{R}$ with a tagged partition
$$a = x_0 < x_1 < \dots < x_n = b, \quad x_0 \le t_1 \le x_1, x_1 \le t_2 \le x_2, \dots, x_{n-1} \le t_n \le x_n,$$
one approximation of the "Riemann definition" of the type I product integral is given by
$$\prod_{k=1}^n \left[ \big(1 + f(t_k)\big) \cdot (x_k - x_{k-1}) \right].$$

The (type I) product integral was defined to be, roughly speaking, the limit of these products by Ludwig Schlesinger in a 1931 article.

Another approximation of the "Riemann definition" of the Type I product integral is defined as
$$\prod_{k=1}^n \exp\big(f(t_k) \cdot (x_k - x_{k-1})\big).$$

When $f$ is a constant function, the limit of the first type of approximation is equal to the second type of approximation. Notice that in general, for a step function, the value of the second type of approximation does not depend on the partition, as long as the partition is a refinement of the partition defining the step function, whereas the value of the first type of approximation does depend on the fineness of the partition, even when it is a refinement of the partition defining the step function.

It turns out that for any product-integrable function $f$, the limit of the first type of approximation equals the limit of the second type of approximation. Since, for step functions, the value of the second type of approximation doesn't depend on the fineness of the partition for partitions "fine enough", it makes sense to define the "Lebesgue (type I) product integral" of a step function as
$$\prod_a^b \big(1 + f(x) \,dx\big) \overset{def}{=} \prod_{k=1}^n \exp\big(f(s_k) \cdot (y_k - y_{k-1})\big),$$
where $y_0 < a = s_1 <$ $y_1 < \dots < y_{n-1} <$ $s_n < y_n = b$ is the tagged partition corresponding to the step function $f$. (In contrast, the corresponding quantity would not be unambiguously defined using the first type of approximation.)

This generalizes to arbitrary measure spaces readily. If $X$ is a measure space with measure $\mu$, then for any product-integrable simple function $f(x) = \sum_{k=1}^n a_k I_{A_k}(x)$ (i.e. a conical combination of the indicator functions for some disjoint measurable sets $A_1, A_2, \dots, A_n \subseteq X$), its type I product integral is defined to be
$$\prod_X \big(1 + f(x) \,d\mu(x)\big) \overset{def}{=} \prod_{k=1}^n \exp\big(a_k \mu(A_k)\big),$$
since $a_k$ is the value of $f$ at any point of $A_k$. In the special case where $X = \mathbb{R}$, $\mu$ is Lebesgue measure, and all of the measurable sets $A_k$ are intervals, one can verify that this is equal to the definition given above for that special case. Analogous to the theory of Lebesgue (classical) integrals, the Type I product integral of any product-integrable function $f$ can be written as the limit of an increasing sequence of Volterra product integrals of product-integrable simple functions.

Taking logarithms of both sides of the above definition, one gets that for any product-integrable simple function $f$:
$$\begin{align}
& \ln \left(\prod_X \big(1 + f(x) \,d\mu(x)\big) \right) = \ln \left( \prod_{k=1}^n \exp\big(a_k \mu(A_k)\big) \right) = \sum_{k=1}^n a_k \mu(A_k) = \int_X f(x) \,d\mu(x) \\
& \quad\iff \prod_X \big(1 + f(x) \,d\mu(x)\big) = \exp \left( \int_X f(x) \,d\mu(x) \right),
\end{align}$$
where we used the definition of integral for simple functions. Moreover, because continuous functions like $\exp$ can be interchanged with limits, and the product integral of any product-integrable function $f$ is equal to the limit of product integrals of simple functions, it follows that the relationship
$$\prod_X \big(1 + f(x) \,d\mu(x)\big) = \exp \left( \int_X f(x) \,d\mu(x) \right)$$
holds generally for any product-integrable $f$. This clearly generalizes the property mentioned above.

The Type I integral is multiplicative as a set function, which can be shown using the above property. More specifically, given a product-integrable function $f$ one can define a set function ${\cal V}_f$ by defining, for every measurable set $B \subseteq X$,
$${\cal V}_f(B) \overset{def}{=} \prod_B \big(1 + f(x) \,d\mu(x)\big) \overset{def}{=} \prod_X \big(1 + (f \cdot I_B)(x) \,d\mu(x)\big),$$
where $I_B(x)$ denotes the indicator function of $B$. Then for any two disjoint measurable sets $B_1, B_2$ one has
$$\begin{align}
{\cal V}_f(B_1 \sqcup B_2) &= \prod_{B_1 \sqcup B_2} \big(1 + f(x) \,d\mu(x)\big) \\
&= \exp\left( \int_{B_1 \sqcup B_2} f(x) \,d\mu(x) \right) \\
&= \exp\left( \int_{B_1} f(x) \,d\mu(x) + \int_{B_2} f(x) \,d\mu(x) \right) \\
&= \exp\left( \int_{B_1} f(x) \,d\mu(x) \right) \exp\left( \int_{B_2} f(x) \,d\mu(x) \right) \\
&= \prod_{B_1} (1 + f(x)d \mu(x)) \prod_{ B_2} (1 + f(x) \,d\mu(x)) \\
&= {\cal V}_f(B_1 ) {\cal V}_f(B_2).
\end{align}$$

This property can be contrasted with measures, which are sigma-additive set functions.

However, the Type I integral is not multiplicative as a functional. Given two product-integrable functions $f,g$, and a measurable set $A$, it is generally the case that
$$\prod_A \big(1 + (fg)(x) \,d\mu(x)\big) \neq \prod_A \big(1 + f(x) \,d\mu(x)\big) \prod_A \big(1 + g(x) \,d\mu(x)\big).$$

=== Type II: Geometric integral ===
If $X$ is a measure space with measure $\mu$, then for any product-integrable simple function $f(x) = \sum_{k=1}^n a_k I_{A_k}(x)$ (i.e. a conical combination of the indicator functions for some disjoint measurable sets $A_1, A_2, \dots, A_n \subseteq X$), its type II product integral is defined to be
$$\prod_X f(x)^{d\mu(x)} \overset{def}{=} \prod_{k=1}^n a_k^{\mu(A_k)}.$$

This can be seen to generalize the definition given above.

Taking logarithms of both sides, we see that for any product-integrable simple function $f$:
$$\begin{align}
& \ln \left( \prod_X f(x)^{d\mu(x)} \right) = \sum_{k=1}^n \ln(a_k) \mu(A_k) = \int_X \ln f(x) \,d\mu (x) \\
& \quad \iff \prod_X f(x)^{d\mu(x)} = \exp\left( \int_X \ln f(x) \,d\mu (x) \right),
\end{align}$$
where the definition of the Lebesgue integral for simple functions was used. This observation, analogous to the one already made for Type II integrals above, allows one to entirely reduce the "Lebesgue theory of type II geometric integrals" to the Lebesgue theory of (classical) integrals. In other words, because continuous functions like $\exp$ and $\ln$ can be interchanged with limits, and the product integral of any product-integrable function $f$ is equal to the limit of some increasing sequence of product integrals of simple functions, it follows that the relationship
$$\prod_X f(x)^{d\mu(x)} = \exp\left( \int_X \ln f(x) \,d\mu(x) \right)$$
holds generally for any product-integrable $f$. This generalizes the property of geometric integrals mentioned above.

== See also ==
- Haar measure
- Picard iteration
- List of derivatives and integrals in alternative calculi
- Indefinite product
- Logarithmic derivative
- Ordered exponential
- Fractal derivative
