= Transition matrix =

Transition matrix may refer to:

- Change-of-basis matrix, associated with a change of basis for a vector space.
- Stochastic matrix, a square matrix used to describe the transitions of a Markov chain.
- State-transition matrix, a matrix whose product with the state vector $x$ at an initial time $t_0$ gives $x$ at a later time $t$.
