= Product integration =

Product integration may refer to:

- Product placement
- Product integral
