= Ordered exponential =

Generalisation of the exponential integral to non-commutative algebras

The ordered exponential, also called the path-ordered exponential, is a mathematical operation defined in non-commutative algebras, equivalent to the exponential of the integral in the commutative algebras. In practice the ordered exponential is used in matrix and operator algebras. It is a kind of product integral, or Volterra integral.

== Definition ==
Let A be an algebra over a field K, and a(t) be an element of A parameterized by the real numbers,

$$a : \R \to A.$$

The parameter t in a(t) is often referred to as the time parameter in this context.

The ordered exponential of a is denoted

$$\begin{align}
\operatorname{OE}[a](t) \equiv \mathcal{T} \left\{e^{\int_0^t a(t') \, dt'}\right\} & \equiv \sum_{n = 0}^\infty \frac{1}{n!} \int_0^t dt'_1 \cdots \int_0^t dt'_n \; \mathcal{T} \left\{a(t'_1) \cdots a(t'_n)\right\} \\
& = \sum_{n = 0}^\infty \int_0^t dt'_1 \int_0^{t'_1} dt'_2 \int_0^{t'_2}dt'_3 \cdots \int_0^{t'_{n-1}} dt'_n \; a(t'_1) \cdots a(t'_n)
\end{align}$$

where the term n = 0 is equal to 1 and where $\mathcal{T}$ is the time-ordering operator. It is a higher-order operation that ensures the exponential is time-ordered, so that any product of a(t) that occurs in the expansion of the exponential is ordered such that the value of t is increasing from right to left of the product. For example:

$$\mathcal{T} \left\{a(1.2) a(9.5) a(4.1)\right\} = a(9.5) a(4.1) a(1.2).$$

Time ordering is required, as products in the algebra are not necessarily commutative.

The operation maps a parameterized element onto another parameterized element, or symbolically,

$$\operatorname{OE} \mathrel{:} (\R \to A) \to (\R \to A).$$

There are various ways to define this integral more rigorously.

=== Product of exponentials ===
The ordered exponential can be defined as the left product integral of the infinitesimal exponentials, or equivalently, as an ordered product of exponentials in the limit as the number of terms grows to infinity:

$$\operatorname{OE}[a](t) = \prod_0^t e^{a(t') \, dt'} \equiv
\lim_{N \to \infty} \left(
e^{a(t_N) \, \Delta t} e^{a(t_{N-1}) \, \Delta t} \cdots
e^{a(t_1) \, \Delta t} e^{a(t_0) \, \Delta t}
\right)$$

where the time moments {t_{0}, ..., t_{N}} are defined as t_{i} ≡ i Δt for i = 0, ..., N, and Δt ≡ t / N.

The ordered exponential is in fact a geometric integral.

=== Solution to a differential equation ===
The ordered exponential is unique solution of the initial value problem:

$$\begin{align}
\frac{d}{d t} \operatorname{OE}[a](t) &= a(t) \operatorname{OE}[a](t), \\[5pt]
\operatorname{OE}[a](0) &= 1.
\end{align}$$

=== Solution to an integral equation ===
The ordered exponential is the solution to the integral equation:

$$\operatorname{OE}[a](t) = 1 + \int_0^t a(t') \operatorname{OE}[a](t') \, dt'.$$

This equation is equivalent to the previous initial value problem.

=== Infinite series expansion ===
The ordered exponential can be defined as an infinite sum,

$$\operatorname{OE}[a](t) = 1 + \int_0^t a(t_1) \, dt_1+ \int_0^t dt_1 \int_0^{t_1} dt_2 \; a(t_1) a(t_2) + \cdots.$$

This can be derived by recursively substituting the integral equation into itself.

== Example ==
Given a manifold $M$ where for a $e \in TM$ with group transformation $g: e \mapsto g e$ it holds at a point $x \in M$:

$$de(x) + \operatorname{J}(x)e(x) = 0.$$

Here, $d$ denotes exterior differentiation and $\operatorname{J}(x)$ is the connection operator (1-form field) acting on $e(x)$. When integrating above equation it holds (now, $\operatorname{J}(x)$ is the connection operator expressed in a coordinate basis)

$$e(y) = \operatorname{P} \exp \left(- \int_x^y J(\gamma (t)) \gamma '(t) \, dt \right) e(x)$$

with the path-ordering operator $\operatorname{P}$ that orders factors in order of the path $\gamma(t) \in M$. For the special case that $\operatorname{J}(x)$ is an antisymmetric operator and $\gamma$ is an infinitesimal rectangle with edge lengths $|u|,|v|$ and corners at points $x,x+u,x+u+v,x+v,$ above expression simplifies as follows :

$$\begin{align}
& \operatorname{OE}[- \operatorname{J}]e(x) \\[5pt]
= {} & \exp [- \operatorname{J}(x+v) (-v)] \exp [- \operatorname{J}(x+u+v) (-u)] \exp [- \operatorname{J}(x+u) v] \exp [- \operatorname{J}(x) u] e(x) \\[5pt]
= {} & [1 - \operatorname{J}(x+v) (-v)][1 - \operatorname{J}(x+u+v) (-u)][1 - \operatorname{J}(x+u) v][1 - \operatorname{J}(x) u] e(x).
\end{align}$$

Hence, it holds the group transformation identity $\operatorname{OE}[- \operatorname{J}] \mapsto g \operatorname{OE}[\operatorname{J}] g^{-1}$. If $- \operatorname{J}(x)$ is a smooth connection, expanding above quantity to second order in infinitesimal quantities $|u|,|v|$ one obtains for the ordered exponential the identity with a correction term that is proportional to the curvature tensor.

== See also ==
- Path-ordering (essentially the same concept)
- Magnus expansion
- Product integral
- Haar measure
- List of derivatives and integrals in alternative calculi
- Indefinite product
- Fractal derivative
