= State-transition matrix =

Describes state evolution of a linear system

In control theory and dynamical systems theory, the state-transition matrix is a matrix function that describes how the state of a linear system changes over time. Essentially, if the system's state is known at an initial time $t_0$, the state-transition matrix allows for the calculation of the state at any future time $t$.

The matrix is used to find the general solution to the homogeneous linear differential equation $\dot{\mathbf{x}}(t) = \mathbf{A}(t) \mathbf{x}(t)$ and is also a key component in finding the full solution for the non-homogeneous (input-driven) case.

For linear time-invariant (LTI) systems, where the matrix $\mathbf{A}$ is constant, the state-transition matrix is the matrix exponential $\textstyle \exp{(\mathbf{A}(t-t_0))}$. In the more complex time-variant case, where $\mathbf{A}(t)$ can change over time, there is no simple formula, and the matrix is typically found by calculating the Peano–Baker series.

== Linear systems solutions ==
The state-transition matrix is used to find the solution to a general state-space representation of a linear system in the following form
$$\dot{\mathbf{x}}(t) = \mathbf{A}(t) \mathbf{x}(t) + \mathbf{B}(t) \mathbf{u}(t), \;\mathbf{x}(t_0) = \mathbf{x}_0,$$
where $\mathbf{x}(t)$ are the states of the system; $\mathbf{u}(t)$ is the input signal; $\mathbf{A}(t)$ and $\mathbf{B}(t)$ are matrix functions; and $\mathbf{x}_0$ is the initial condition at $t_0$. Using the state-transition matrix $\mathbf{\Phi}(t, \tau)$, the solution is given by:
$$\mathbf{x}(t)= \mathbf{\Phi} (t, t_0)\mathbf{x}(t_0)+\int_{t_0}^t \mathbf{\Phi}(t, \tau)\mathbf{B}(\tau)\mathbf{u}(\tau)\ d\tau.$$

The first term is known as the zero-input response and represents how the system's state would evolve in the absence of any input. The second term is known as the zero-state response and defines how the inputs impact the system.

== Peano–Baker series ==
The most general transition matrix is given by a product integral, referred to as the Peano–Baker series:
$$\begin{align}
\mathbf{\Phi}(t,\tau) = \mathbf{I} &+ \int_\tau^t\mathbf{A}(\sigma_1)\,d\sigma_1 \\
&+ \int_\tau^t\mathbf{A}(\sigma_1)\int_\tau^{\sigma_1}\mathbf{A}(\sigma_2)\,d\sigma_2\,d\sigma_1 \\
&+ \int_\tau^t\mathbf{A}(\sigma_1)\int_\tau^{\sigma_1}\mathbf{A}(\sigma_2)\int_\tau^{\sigma_2}\mathbf{A}(\sigma_3)\,d\sigma_3\,d\sigma_2\,d\sigma_1 \\
&+ \cdots,
\end{align}$$
where $\mathbf{I}$ is the identity matrix. This matrix converges uniformly and absolutely to a solution that exists and is unique. The series has a formal sum that can be written as
$$\mathbf{\Phi}(t,\tau) = \exp \mathcal{T}\int_\tau^t\mathbf{A}(\sigma)\,d\sigma,$$
where $\mathcal{T}$ is the time-ordering operator, used to ensure that the repeated product integral is in proper order. The Magnus expansion provides a means for evaluating this product.

== Other properties ==
The state transition matrix $\mathbf{\Phi}$ satisfies the following relationships. These relationships are generic to the product integral.

1. It is continuous and has continuous derivatives.
2. It is never singular; in fact $\mathbf{\Phi}^{-1}(t, \tau) = \mathbf{ \Phi}(\tau, t)$ and $\textstyle \mathbf{\Phi}^{-1}(t, \tau)\mathbf{\Phi}(t, \tau) = \mathbf I$, where $\mathbf I$ is the identity matrix.
3. $\mathbf{\Phi}(t, t) = \mathbf I$ for all $t$.
4. $\mathbf{\Phi}(t_2, t_1)\mathbf{\Phi}(t_1, t_0) = \mathbf{\Phi}(t_2, t_0)$ for all $t_0 \leq t_1 \leq t_2$.
5. It satisfies the differential equation $\frac{\partial}{\partial t} \mathbf{\Phi}(t, t_0)= \mathbf{A}(t)\mathbf{\Phi}(t, t_0)$ with initial conditions ${{{1}}}$.
6. The state-transition matrix $\mathbf{\Phi}(t,\tau)$, given by $\mathbf{\Phi}(t, \tau)\equiv\mathbf{U}(t)\mathbf{U}^{-1}(\tau)$ where the $n \times n$ matrix $\mathbf{U}(t)$ is the fundamental solution matrix that satisfies $\dot{\mathbf{U}}(t)=\mathbf{A}(t)\mathbf{U}(t)$ with initial condition $\mathbf{U}(t_0) = \mathbf I$.
7. Given the state $\mathbf{x}(\tau)$ at any time $\tau$, the state at any other time $t$ is given by the mapping $\mathbf{x}(t)=\mathbf{\Phi}(t,\tau)\mathbf{x}(\tau)$.

== Estimation of the state-transition matrix ==
In the time-invariant case, we can define $\mathbf{\Phi}$, using the matrix exponential, as $\textstyle \mathbf{\Phi}(t, t_0) = \exp{(\mathbf{A}(t - t_0))}$.

In the time-variant case, the state-transition matrix $\mathbf{\Phi}(t, t_0)$ can be estimated from the solutions of the differential equation $\dot{\mathbf{u}}(t)=\mathbf{A}(t)\mathbf{u}(t)$ with initial conditions $\mathbf{u}(t_0)$ given by $\textstyle [1,\ 0,\ \ldots,\ 0]^\mathrm{T}$, $\textstyle [0,\ 1,\ \ldots,\ 0]^\mathrm{T}$, ..., $\textstyle [0,\ 0,\ \ldots,\ 1]^\mathrm{T}$. The corresponding solutions provide the $n$ columns of matrix $\mathbf{\Phi}(t, t_0)$. Now, from property 4, $\mathbf{\Phi}(t, \tau) = \mathbf{\Phi}(t, t_0)\mathbf{\Phi}(\tau, t_0)^{-1}$ for all $t_0 \leq \tau \leq t$. The state-transition matrix must be determined before analysis on the time-varying solution can continue.

== See also ==
- Magnus expansion
- Liouville's formula
