= Perturbation theory (quantum mechanics) =

Mathematical approach to quantum physics

In quantum mechanics, perturbation theory is a set of approximation schemes directly related to mathematical perturbation for describing a complicated quantum system in terms of a simpler, known system. The idea is to start with a simple system for which a mathematical solution is known (e.g. the time-independent Schrödinger equation: ${\hat H}|\Psi\rangle = E |\Psi\rangle$) and add an additional "perturbing" Hamiltonian ($H'$) representing a weak disturbance to the known system to the original Hamiltonian ($H_0$) of the known system (i.e. $\hat H = H_0 + H'$). If the disturbance is small, the new energy levels and eigenstates of the perturbed system can be expressed as "corrections" to the known energy levels and eigenstates of the simpler system. These corrections can be made at progressively smaller orders of magnitude until an n-th order that is so small a correction that it is negligible to the accuracy of the approximation.

== Approximate Hamiltonians ==
Perturbation theory is an important tool for describing quantum systems without exact solutions. Systems with known exact solutions, such as the hydrogen atom, the quantum harmonic oscillator, and the particle in a box, are idealized and may not adequately describe related systems. Perturbation theory uses known solutions to generate solutions for more complicated systems. The procedure uses approximations to the system Hamiltonian.

== Applying perturbation theory ==
Perturbation theory is applicable if the problem at hand cannot be solved exactly, but can be formulated by adding a "small" term to the mathematical description of the exactly solvable problem.

For example, by adding a perturbative electric potential to the quantum mechanical model of the hydrogen atom, tiny shifts in the spectral lines of hydrogen caused by the presence of an electric field (the Stark effect) can be calculated. This is only approximate because the sum of a Coulomb potential with a linear potential is unstable (has no true bound states) although the tunneling time (decay rate) is very long. This instability shows up as a broadening of the energy spectrum lines, which perturbation theory fails to reproduce entirely.

The expressions produced by perturbation theory are not exact, but they can lead to accurate results as long as the expansion parameter, say α, is very small. Typically, the results are expressed in terms of finite power series in α that seem to converge to the exact values when summed to higher order. After a certain order n ~ 1/α however, the results become increasingly worse since the series are usually divergent (being asymptotic series). There exist ways to convert them into convergent series, which can be evaluated for large-expansion parameters, most efficiently by the variational method. In practice, convergent perturbation expansions often converge slowly while divergent perturbation expansions sometimes give good results, c.f. the exact solution, at lower order.

In the theory of quantum electrodynamics (QED), in which the electron–photon interaction is treated perturbatively, the calculation of the electron's magnetic moment has been found to agree with experiment to eleven decimal places. In QED and other quantum field theories, special calculation techniques known as Feynman diagrams are used to systematically sum the power series terms.

=== Limitations ===
==== Large perturbations ====
Some systems cannot be described by a small perturbation imposed on some simple system. Perturbation theory requires small perturbations. In quantum chromodynamics, for instance, the interaction of quarks with the gluon field cannot be treated perturbatively at low energies because the coupling constant (the expansion parameter) becomes too large, violating the requirement that corrections must be small.

==== Non-adiabatic states ====
Perturbation theory also fails to describe states that are not generated adiabatically from the "free model", including bound states and various collective phenomena such as solitons. A system of free (i.e. non-interacting) particles, to which an attractive interaction is introduced, may create an entirely new set of eigenstates corresponding to groups of particles bound to one another. An example of this phenomenon may be found in conventional superconductivity, in which the phonon-mediated attraction between conduction electrons leads to the formation of correlated electron pairs known as Cooper pairs. Perturbation theory fails because there is no analogue of a bound particle in the unperturbed model and the energy of a soliton typically goes as the inverse of the expansion parameter. Other approximation schemes, such as the variational method and the WKB approximation may apply to these cases.

==== Difficult computations ====
The problem of non-perturbative systems has been somewhat alleviated by the advent of modern computers. It has become practical to obtain numerical non-perturbative solutions for certain problems, using methods such as density functional theory. These advances have been of particular benefit to the field of quantum chemistry. Computers have also been used to carry out perturbation theory calculations to extraordinarily high levels of precision, which has proven important in particle physics for generating theoretical results that can be compared with experiment.

== Time-independent perturbation theory ==
Time-independent perturbation theory is one of two categories of perturbation theory, the other being time-dependent perturbation (see next section). In time-independent perturbation theory, the perturbation Hamiltonian is static (i.e., possesses no time dependence). Time-independent perturbation theory was presented by Erwin Schrödinger in a 1926 paper, shortly after he produced his theories in wave mechanics. In this paper Schrödinger referred to earlier work of Lord Rayleigh, who investigated harmonic vibrations of a string perturbed by small inhomogeneities. This is why this perturbation theory is often referred to as Rayleigh–Schrödinger perturbation theory. Time-independent perturbation theory can itself be separated into non-degenerate and degenerate perturbation theory.

=== Non-degenerate perturbation theory ===
==== First order corrections ====
The process begins with an unperturbed Hamiltonian H_{0}, which is assumed to have no time dependence. It has known energy levels and eigenstates, arising from the time-independent Schrödinger equation:

$$H_0 \left |n^{(0)} \right \rang = E_n^{(0)} \left |n^{(0)} \right\rang,  \qquad n = 1, 2, 3, \cdots$$

For simplicity, it is assumed that the energies are discrete. The (0) superscripts denote that these quantities are associated with the unperturbed system. Note the use of bra–ket notation.

A perturbation is then introduced to the Hamiltonian. Let V be a Hamiltonian representing a weak physical disturbance, such as a potential energy produced by an external field. Thus, V is formally a Hermitian operator. Let λ be a dimensionless parameter that can take on values ranging continuously from 0 (no perturbation) to 1 (the full perturbation). The perturbed Hamiltonian is:

$$H = H_0 + \lambda V$$

The energy levels and eigenstates of the perturbed Hamiltonian are again given by the time-independent Schrödinger equation,
$$\left(H_0 + \lambda V \right) |n\rang = E_n |n\rang .$$

The objective is to express E_{n} and $|n\rang$ in terms of the energy levels and eigenstates of the old Hamiltonian. If the perturbation is sufficiently weak, they can be written as a (Maclaurin) power series in λ,
$$\begin{align}
E_n &= E_n^{(0)} + \lambda E_n^{(1)} + \lambda^2 E_n^{(2)} + \cdots \\ [1ex]
|n\rang &= \left |n^{(0)} \right \rang + \lambda \left |n^{(1)} \right \rang + \lambda^2 \left |n^{(2)} \right \rang + \cdots
\end{align}$$
where
$$\begin{align}
E_n^{(k)} &= \frac{1}{k!} \frac{d^k E_n}{d \lambda^k} \bigg|_{\lambda = 0} \\[1ex]
\left |n^{(k)} \right \rang &= \left.\frac{1}{k!}\frac{d^k |n\rang }{d \lambda^k} \right|_{\lambda = 0 .}
\end{align}$$

When k = 0, these reduce to the unperturbed values, which are the first term in each series. Since the perturbation is weak, the energy levels and eigenstates should not deviate too much from their unperturbed values, and the terms should rapidly become smaller as the order is increased.

Substituting the power series expansion into the Schrödinger equation produces:

$$\left(H_0 + \lambda V \right) \left(\left |n^{(0)} \right \rang + \lambda \left |n^{(1)} \right \rang + \cdots \right) = \left(E_n^{(0)} + \lambda E_n^{(1)} +  \cdots \right) \left(\left |n^{(0)} \right \rang + \lambda \left |n^{(1)} \right \rang + \cdots \right).$$

Expanding this equation and comparing coefficients of each power of λ results in an infinite series of simultaneous equations. The zeroth-order equation is simply the Schrödinger equation for the unperturbed system,
$$H_0 \left| n^{(0)} \right\rang = E_n^{(0)} \left| n^{(0)} \right\rang .$$

The first-order equation is
$$H_0 \left |n^{(1)} \right \rang + V \left |n^{(0)} \right \rang = E_n^{(0)} \left |n^{(1)} \right \rang + E_n^{(1)} \left |n^{(0)} \right \rang .$$

Operating through by $\lang n^{(0)} |$, the first term on the left-hand side cancels the first term on the right-hand side. (Recall, the unperturbed Hamiltonian is Hermitian). This leads to the first-order energy shift,
$$E_n^{(1)} = \left \langle n^{(0)} \right | V \left |n^{(0)} \right \rang .$$
This is simply the expectation value of the perturbation Hamiltonian while the system is in the unperturbed eigenstate.

This result can be interpreted in the following way: supposing that the perturbation is applied, but the system is kept in the quantum state $|n^{(0)}\rang$, which is a valid quantum state though no longer an energy eigenstate. The perturbation causes the average energy of this state to increase by $\lang n^{(0)}|V|n^{(0)}\rang$. However, the true energy shift is slightly different, because the perturbed eigenstate is not exactly the same as $|n^{(0)}\rang$. These further shifts are given by the second and higher order corrections to the energy.

Before corrections to the energy eigenstate are computed, the issue of normalization must be addressed. Supposing that
$$\left \lang n^{(0)} \right | \left. n^{(0)} \right \rang = 1,$$
but perturbation theory also assumes that $\lang n | n \rang = 1$.

Then at first order in λ, the following must be true:
$$\left( \left\lang n^{(0)}\right| + \lambda \left\lang n^{(1)} \right| \right) \left(\left| n^{(0)} \right\rang + \lambda \left| n^{(1)} \right\rang \right) = 1$$
$$\left \lang n^{(0)} \right | \left. n^{(0)} \right \rang + \lambda \left \lang n^{(0)} \right | \left. n^{(1)} \right \rang + \lambda\left \lang n^{(1)} \right | \left. n^{(0)} \right \rang + \cancel{\lambda^2 \left \lang n^{(1)} \right | \left . n^{(1)} \right \rang} = 1$$
$$\left \lang n^{(0)} \right | \left. n^{(1)} \right \rang + \left \lang n^{(1)} \right | \left. n^{(0)} \right \rang = 0.$$

The 𝜆^{2} term is dropped in first-order expansions.

Since the overall phase is not determined in quantum mechanics, without loss of generality, in time-independent theory it can be assumed that $\lang n^{(0)}|n^{(1)} \rang$ is purely real. Therefore,
$$\left \lang n^{(0)} \right | \left. n^{(1)} \right \rang =  \left \lang n^{(1)} \right | \left. n^{(0)} \right \rang =  -\left \lang n^{(1)} \right | \left. n^{(0)} \right \rang,$$
leading to
$$\left \lang n^{(0)} \right | \left. n^{(1)} \right \rang = 0.$$

To obtain the first-order correction to the energy eigenstate, the expression for the first-order energy correction is inserted back into the result shown above, equating the first-order coefficients of λ.

The first-order correction to the energy eigenstate can also be obtained through the following considerations. By using the resolution of the identity:
$$\begin{align}
V \left |n^{(0)} \right \rang &= \left( \sum_{k} \left |k^{(0)} \right \rang \left \lang k^{(0)} \right | \right) V \left |n^{(0)} \right \rang \\
&= \left( \sum_{k\ne n} \left |k^{(0)} \right \rang \left \lang k^{(0)} \right | \right) V \left |n^{(0)} \right \rang  + \left(\left |n^{(0)} \right \rangle \left \lang n^{(0)} \right |\right)  V \left |n^{(0)} \right \rang  \\
&= \sum_{k\ne n} \left |k^{(0)} \right \rang \left \lang k^{(0)} \right | V \left |n^{(0)} \right \rangle  + E_n^{(1)} \left |n^{(0)} \right \rang,
\end{align}$$
where the $|k^{(0)}\rangle$ are in the orthogonal complement of $|n^{(0)}\rangle$, i.e., the other eigenvectors.

The first-order equation may thus be expressed as
$$\left(E_n^{(0)} - H_0 \right) \left |n^{(1)} \right \rang = \sum_{k \ne n} \left |k^{(0)} \right \rang \left \langle k^{(0)} \right |V\left |n^{(0)} \right \rang .$$

Suppose that the zeroth-order energy level is not degenerate, i.e. that there is no eigenstate of H_{0} in the orthogonal complement of $|n^{(0)}\rangle$ with the energy $E_n^{(0)}$. After renaming the summation dummy index above as $k'$, any $k\neq n$ can be chosen and multiplying the first-order equation through by $\lang k^{(0)}|$ gives
$$\left(E_n^{(0)} - E_k^{(0)} \right) \left \langle k^{(0)} \right. \left |n^{(1)} \right \rang = \left \langle k^{(0)} \right |V\left |n^{(0)} \right \rang .$$

The above $\langle k^{(0)} |n^{(1)} \rang$ is, by definition, the component of the first-order correction $|n^{(1)}\rang$ along $|k^{(0)}\rang$. Thus, in the H_{0} basis, $|n^{(1)}\rang$ can be expressed as:
$$\left |n^{(1)} \right \rang = \sum_{k \ne n} \frac{\left \langle k^{(0)} \right |V\left |n^{(0)} \right \rang}{E_n^{(0)} - E_k^{(0)}} \left |k^{(0)} \right \rang .$$

The first-order change in the n-th energy eigenstate has a contribution from each of the other energy eigenstates k ≠ n. Each term is proportional to the matrix element $\lang k^{(0)} | V | n^{(0)} \rang$, which is a measure of how much the perturbation mixes eigenstate n with eigenstate k; it is also inversely proportional to the energy difference between eigenstates k and n, which means that the perturbation deforms the eigenstate to a greater extent if there are more eigenstates at nearby energies. The expression is singular if any of these states have the same energy as state n, which is why it was assumed that there is no degeneracy. The above formula for the perturbed eigenstates also implies that the perturbation theory can be legitimately used only when the absolute magnitude of the matrix elements of the perturbation is small compared with the corresponding differences in the unperturbed energy levels, i.e., $|\lang k^{(0)} | V | n^{(0)} \rang| \ll | E_n^{(0)} - E_k^{(0)}|.$

==== Second-order and higher-order corrections ====
Higher-order deviations are calculated by a similar procedure, though the calculations become quite tedious within this formulation. Normalization convention, of the whole state vectors of the perturbed Schrodinger equation being orthonormal, gives

$$2 \operatorname{Re}(\left \lang n^{(0)} \right | \left. n^{(2)} \right \rang) + \left \lang n^{(1)} \right | \left. n^{(1)} \right \rang = 0.$$

We will bring a phase to the whole state vector of the perturbed Schrodinger equation which will lead to the first term having only a real part. Up to second order, the expressions for the energies and (normalized) eigenstates are:

$$E^{(2)}_n(\lambda) = E_n^{(0)} + \lambda \left \langle n^{(0)} \right |V\left |n^{(0)} \right \rang  + \lambda^2\sum_{k \ne n} \frac{\left |\left \langle k^{(0)} \right |V\left |n^{(0)} \right \rang \right |^2} {E_n^{(0)} - E_k^{(0)}} + O(\lambda^3)$$

$$\begin{align}
|n^{(2)}(\lambda)\rangle = \left |n^{(0)} \right \rangle &+ \lambda\sum_{k \ne n} \left |k^{(0)}\right\rangle \frac{\left\langle k^{(0)}\right|V\left|n^{(0)}\right\rangle}{E_n^{(0)}-E_k^{(0)}} + \lambda^2\sum_{k\neq n}\sum_{\ell \neq n} \left |k^{(0)}\right\rangle \frac{\left \langle k^{(0)} \right |V \left |\ell^{(0)} \right \rangle \left \langle \ell^{(0)} \right |V \left |n^{(0)} \right \rangle}{\left (E_n^{(0)}-E_k^{(0)}\right ) \left (E_n^{(0)}-E_\ell^{(0)} \right )} \\[1ex]
& -\lambda^2 \sum_{k\neq n}\left |k^{(0)}\right\rangle \frac{\left \langle k^{(0)} \right |V\left |n^{(0)} \right \rang \left \langle n^{(0)} \right |V\left |n^{(0)} \right \rang}{\left (E_n^{(0)}-E_k^{(0)} \right )^2} - \frac{1}{2} \lambda^2 \left |n^{(0)} \right \rangle\sum_{k \ne n} \frac{|\left \langle k^{(0)} \right |V\left |n^{(0)} \right \rang|^2}{\left (E_n^{(0)}-E_k^{(0)} \right )^2} + O(\lambda^3).
\end{align}$$
If an intermediate normalization is taken (in other words, if it is required that $\langle n^{(0)}|n(\lambda) \rangle=1$), then we obtain a nearly identical expression for the second-order correction to the correction given immediately above. To be precise, for an intermediate normalization, the last term would be omitted.

Extending the process further, the third-order energy correction can be shown to be

$$E_n^{(3)} = \sum_{k \neq n} \sum_{m \neq n} \frac{\langle n^{(0)} | V | m^{(0)} \rangle \langle m^{(0)} | V | k^{(0)} \rangle \langle k^{(0)} | V | n^{(0)} \rangle}{\left(E_n^{(0)} - E_m^{(0)} \right) \left(E_n^{(0)} - E_k^{(0)} \right)} - \langle n^{(0)} | V | n^{(0)} \rangle \sum_{m \neq n} \frac{|\langle n^{(0)} | V | m^{(0)} \rangle|^2}{\left( E_n^{(0)} - E_m^{(0)} \right)^2}.$$

Corrections to fifth order (energies) and fourth order (states) in compact notation

If we introduce the notation,

$$V_{nm}\equiv\langle n^{(0)}|V|m^{(0)}\rangle,$$
$$E_{nm}\equiv E_n^{(0)}-E_m^{(0)},$$

then the energy corrections to fifth order can be written

$$\begin{align}
E_n^{(1)} &= V_{nn} \\
E_n^{(2)} &= \frac{|V_{nk_2}|^2}{E_{nk_2}} \\
E_n^{(3)} &= \frac{V_{nk_3}V_{k_3k_2}V_{k_2n}}{E_{nk_2}E_{nk_3}}-V_{nn}\frac{|V_{nk_3}|^2}{E_{nk_3}^2} \\
E_n^{(4)} &= \frac{V_{nk_4}V_{k_4k_3}V_{k_3k_2}V_{k_2n}}{E_{nk_2}E_{nk_3}E_{nk_4}}-\frac{|V_{nk_4}|^2}{E_{nk_4}^2}\frac{|V_{nk_2}|^2}{E_{nk_2}}-V_{nn}\frac{V_{nk_4}V_{k_4k_3}V_{k_3n}}{E_{nk_3}^2E_{nk_4}}-V_{nn}\frac{V_{nk_4}V_{k_4k_2}V_{k_2n}}{E_{nk_2}E_{nk_4}^2}+V_{nn}^2\frac{|V_{nk_4}|^2}{E_{nk_4}^3} \\
&=\frac{V_{nk_4}V_{k_4k_3}V_{k_3k_2}V_{k_2n}}{E_{nk_2}E_{nk_3}E_{nk_4}}-E_{n}^{(2)}\frac{|V_{nk_4}|^2}{E_{nk_4}^2}-2V_{nn}\frac{V_{nk_4}V_{k_4k_3}V_{k_3n}}{E_{nk_3}^2E_{nk_4}} +V_{nn}^2\frac{|V_{nk_4}|^2}{E_{nk_4}^3} \\
E_n^{(5)} &=\frac{V_{nk_5}V_{k_5k_4}V_{k_4k_3}V_{k_3k_2}V_{k_2n}}{E_{nk_2}E_{nk_3}E_{nk_4}E_{nk_5}}-\frac{V_{nk_5}V_{k_5k_4}V_{k_4n}}{E_{nk_4}^2E_{nk_5}}\frac{|V_{nk_2}|^2}{E_{nk_2}}-\frac{V_{nk_5}V_{k_5k_2}V_{k_2n}}{E_{nk_2}E_{nk_5}^2}\frac{|V_{nk_2}|^2}{E_{nk_2}}-\frac{|V_{nk_5}|^2}{E_{nk_5}^2}\frac{V_{nk_3}V_{k_3k_2}V_{k_2n}}{E_{nk_2}E_{nk_3}} \\
&\quad -V_{nn}\frac{V_{nk_5}V_{k_5k_4}V_{k_4k_3}V_{k_3n}}{E_{nk_3}^2E_{nk_4}E_{nk_5}}-V_{nn}\frac{V_{nk_5}V_{k_5k_4}V_{k_4k_2}V_{k_2n}}{E_{nk_2}E_{nk_4}^2E_{nk_5}}-V_{nn}\frac{V_{nk_5}V_{k_5k_3}V_{k_3k_2}V_{k_2n}}{E_{nk_2}E_{nk_3}E_{nk_5}^2}+V_{nn}\frac{|V_{nk_5}|^2}{E_{nk_5}^2}\frac{|V_{nk_3}|^2}{E_{nk_3}^2}+2V_{nn}\frac{|V_{nk_5}|^2}{E_{nk_5}^3}\frac{|V_{nk_2}|^2}{E_{nk_2}} \\
&\quad +V_{nn}^2\frac{V_{nk_5}V_{k_5k_4}V_{k_4n}}{E_{nk_4}^3E_{nk_5}}+V_{nn}^2\frac{V_{nk_5}V_{k_5k_3}V_{k_3n}}{E_{nk_3}^2E_{nk_5}^2}+V_{nn}^2\frac{V_{nk_5}V_{k_5k_2}V_{k_2n}}{E_{nk_2}E_{nk_5}^3}-V_{nn}^3\frac{|V_{nk_5}|^2}{E_{nk_5}^4} \\
&=\frac{V_{nk_5}V_{k_5k_4}V_{k_4k_3}V_{k_3k_2}V_{k_2n}}{E_{nk_2}E_{nk_3}E_{nk_4}E_{nk_5}}-2E_n^{(2)}\frac{V_{nk_5}V_{k_5k_4}V_{k_4n}}{E_{nk_4}^2E_{nk_5}}-\frac{|V_{nk_5}|^2}{E_{nk_5}^2}\frac{V_{nk_3}V_{k_3k_2}V_{k_2n}}{E_{nk_2}E_{nk_3}} \\
&\quad +V_{nn}\left(-2\frac{V_{nk_5}V_{k_5k_4}V_{k_4k_3}V_{k_3n}}{E_{nk_3}^2E_{nk_4}E_{nk_5}}-\frac{V_{nk_5}V_{k_5k_4}V_{k_4k_2}V_{k_2n}}{E_{nk_2}E_{nk_4}^2E_{nk_5}}+\frac{|V_{nk_5}|^2}{E_{nk_5}^2}\frac{|V_{nk_3}|^2}{E_{nk_3}^2}+2E_n^{(2)}\frac{|V_{nk_5}|^2}{E_{nk_5}^3}\right) \\
&\quad +V_{nn}^2\left(2\frac{V_{nk_5}V_{k_5k_4}V_{k_4n}}{E_{nk_4}^3E_{nk_5}}+\frac{V_{nk_5}V_{k_5k_3}V_{k_3n}}{E_{nk_3}^2E_{nk_5}^2}\right)-V_{nn}^3\frac{|V_{nk_5}|^2}{E_{nk_5}^4}
\end{align}$$
and the states to fourth order can be written
$$\begin{align}
|n^{(1)}\rangle &=\frac{V_{k_1 n}}{E_{n k_1}}|k_1^{(0)}\rangle \\
|n^{(2)}\rangle &=\left(\frac{V_{k_1 k_2}V_{k_2 n}}{E_{n k_1}E_{n k_2}}-\frac{V_{n n}V_{k_1 n}}{E_{n k_1}^2}\right)|k_1^{(0)}\rangle-\frac{1}{2}\frac{V_{n k_1}V_{k_1 n}}{E_{k_1 n}^2}|n^{(0)}\rangle \\
|n^{(3)}\rangle &=\Bigg[-\frac{V_{k_1 k_2}V_{k_2 k_3}V_{k_3 n}}{E_{k_1 n}E_{n k_2}E_{n k_3}}+\frac{V_{nn}V_{k_1 k_2}V_{k_2 n}}{E_{k_1 n}E_{n k_2}} \left(\frac{1}{E_{n k_1}}+\frac{1}{E_{n k_2}}\right)-\frac{|V_{nn}|^2V_{k_1 n}}{E_{k_1 n}^3}+\frac{|V_{n k_2}|^2V_{k_1 n}}{E_{k_1 n}E_{n k_2}}\left(\frac{1}{E_{n k_1}}+\frac{1}{2E_{n k_2}}\right)\Bigg]|k_1^{(0)}\rangle \\
&\quad +\Bigg[-\frac{V_{n k_2}V_{k_2 k_1} V_{k_1 n}+V_{k_2 n}V_{k_1 k_2}V_{n k_1}}{2E_{n k_2}^2E_{n k_1}}+\frac{|V_{n k_1}|^2V_{nn}}{E_{n k_1}^3}\Bigg]|n^{(0)}\rangle \\
|n^{(4)}\rangle &=\Bigg[\frac{V_{k_1k_2}V_{k_2k_3}V_{k_3k_4}V_{k_4 k_2}+V_{k_3k_2}V_{k_1k_2}V_{k_4 k_3}V_{k_2k_4}}{2E_{k_1 n}E_{k_2k_3}^2E_{k_2k_4}}-\frac{V_{k_2k_3}V_{k_3k_4}V_{k_4 n}V_{k_1k_2}}{E_{k_1 n}E_{k_2 n}E_{n k_3}E_{nk_4}}+\frac{V_{k_1k_2}}{E_{k_1 n}}\left(\frac{|V_{k_2k_3}|^2V_{k_2k_2}}{E_{k_2k_3}^3}-\frac{|V_{nk_3}|^2V_{k_2 n}}{E_{k_3 n}^2E_{k_2 n}}\right) \\
&\quad +\frac{V_{nn}V_{k_1k_2}V_{k_3 n}V_{k_2 k_3}}{E_{k_1 n}E_{nk_3}E_{k_2 n}}\left(\frac{1}{E_{nk_3}}+\frac{1}{E_{k_2 n}}+\frac{1}{E_{k_1 n}}\right)+\frac{|V_{k_2 n}|^2V_{k_1k_3}}{E_{nk_2}E_{k_1 n}}\left(\frac{V_{k_3 n}}{E_{nk_1}E_{nk_3}}-\frac{V_{k_3k_1}}{E_{k_3k_1}^2}\right) -\frac{V_{nn} \left(V_{k_3k_2} V_{k_1k_3} V_{k_2k_1} + V_{k_3k_1} V_{k_2k_3} V_{k_1k_2}\right)}{2 E_{k_1 n} E_{k_1k_3}^2E_{k_1 k_2}} \\
&\quad +\frac{|V_{nn}|^2}{E_{k_1 n}}\left(\frac{V_{k_1 n}V_{nn}}{E_{k_1 n}^3} + \frac{V_{k_1 k_2}V_{k_2 n}}{E_{k_2 n}^3}\right)-\frac{|V_{k_1k_2}|^2V_{nn}V_{k_1 n}}{E_{k_1 n}E_{k_1k_2}^3}\Bigg]|k_1^{(0)}\rangle +\frac{1}{2} \left[\frac{V_{nk_1}V_{k_1k_2}}{E_{nk_1}E_{k_2 n}^2}\left(\frac{V_{k_2 n}V_{nn}}{E_{k_2 n}} -\frac{V_{k_2k_3}V_{k_3 n}}{E_{nk_3}}\right) \right.\\
&\quad \left. -\frac{V_{k_1 n}V_{k_2 k_1}}{E_{k_1 n}^2E_{nk_2}}\left(\frac{V_{k_3k_2}V_{nk_3}}{E_{nk_3}}+\frac{V_{nn}V_{nk_2}}{E_{nk_2}}\right)+\frac{|V_{nk_1}|^2}{E_{k_1 n}^2}\left(\frac{3|V_{nk_2}|^2}{4E_{k_2 n}^2}-\frac{2|V_{nn}|^2}{E_{k_1 n}^2}\right)-\frac{V_{k_2 k_3} V_{k_3k_1} |V_{nk_1}|^2} {E_{nk_3}^2E_{nk_1}E_{nk_2}}\right] |n^{(0)}\rangle
\end{align}$$

All terms involved k_{j} should be summed over k_{j} such that the denominator does not vanish.

It is possible to relate the k-th order correction to the energy E_{n} to the k-point connected correlation function of the perturbation V in the state $|n^{(0)}\rangle$. For $k = 2$, one has to consider the inverse Laplace transform $\rho_{n,2}(s)$ of the two-point correlator:
$$\langle n^{(0)} | V(\tau) V(0) | n^{(0)} \rangle - \langle n^{(0)} | V | n^{(0)} \rangle^2 =\mathrel{\mathop:} \int_{\mathbb{R}}\!ds\; \rho_{n,2}(s) \, e^{-(s-E_n^{(0)})\tau}$$
where $V(\tau) = e^{H_0 \tau} V e^{-H_0 \tau}$ is the perturbing operator V in the interaction picture, evolving in Euclidean time. Then
$$E_n^{(2)} = - \int_{\mathbb{R}}\! \frac{ds}{s-E_n^{(0)}} \, \rho_{n,2}(s).$$

Similar formulas exist to all orders in perturbation theory, allowing one to express $E_n^{(k)}$ in terms of the inverse Laplace transform $\rho_{n,k}$ of the connected correlation function
$$\langle n^{(0)} | V(\tau_1 + \ldots + \tau_{k-1}) \dotsm V(\tau_1 + \tau_2) V(\tau_1) V(0) | n^{(0)} \rangle_\text{conn} = \langle n^{(0)} | V(\tau_1 + \ldots + \tau_{k-1}) \dotsm V(\tau_1 + \tau_2)V(\tau_1) V(0) | n^{(0)} \rangle - \text{subtractions}.$$

To be precise, if we write
$$\langle n^{(0)} | V(\tau_1 + \ldots + \tau_{k-1}) \dotsm V(\tau_1 + \tau_2) V(\tau_1) V(0) | n^{(0)} \rangle_\text{conn} = \int_{\mathbb{R}} \, \prod_{i=1}^{k-1} ds_i \, e^{-(s_i-E_n^{(0)})\tau_i} \, \rho_{n,k}(s_1,\ldots,s_{k-1}) \,$$
then the k-th order energy shift is given by

$$E_n^{(k)} = (-1)^{k-1} \int_{\mathbb{R}} \, \prod_{i=1}^{k-1} \frac{ds_i}{s_i - E_n^{(0)}}  \, \rho_{n,k}(s_1,\ldots,s_{k-1}).$$

=== Degenerate perturbation theory ===
Suppose that two or more energy eigenstates of the unperturbed Hamiltonian are degenerate. The first-order energy shift is not well defined, since there is no unique way to choose a basis of eigenstates for the unperturbed system. The various eigenstates for a given energy will perturb with different energies, or may well possess no continuous family of perturbations at all.

This is manifested in the calculation of the perturbed eigenstate via the fact that the operator
$$E_n^{(0)} - H_0$$
does not have a well-defined inverse.

Let D denote the subspace spanned by these degenerate eigenstates. No matter how small the perturbation is, in the degenerate subspace D the energy differences between the eigenstates of H are non-zero, so complete mixing of at least some of these states is assured. Typically, the eigenvalues will split, and the eigenspaces will become simple (one-dimensional), or at least of smaller dimension than D.

The successful perturbations will not be "small" relative to a poorly chosen basis of D. Instead, we consider the perturbation "small" if the new eigenstate is close to the subspace D. The new Hamiltonian must be diagonalized in D, or a slight variation of D, so to speak. These perturbed eigenstates in D are now the basis for the perturbation expansion,
$$|n\rangle =  \sum_{k \in D} \alpha_{nk} |k^{(0)}\rangle + \lambda|n^{(1)}\rangle.$$

For the first-order perturbation, we need solve the perturbed Hamiltonian restricted to the degenerate subspace D,
$$V |k^{(0)}\rangle  = \epsilon_k |k^{(0)}\rangle + \text{small} \qquad \forall |k^{(0)}\rangle \in D,$$
simultaneously for all the degenerate eigenstates, where $\epsilon_k$ are first-order corrections to the degenerate energy levels, and "small" is a vector of $O(\lambda)$ orthogonal to D. This amounts to diagonalizing the matrix
$$\langle k^{(0)} | V |l^{(0)}\rangle = V_{kl} \qquad \forall \; |k^{(0)}\rangle, |l^{(0)}\rangle \in D.$$

This procedure is approximate, since we neglected states outside the D subspace ("small"). The splitting of degenerate energies $\epsilon_k$ is generally observed. Although the splitting may be small, $O(\lambda)$, compared to the range of energies found in the system, it is crucial in understanding certain details, such as spectral lines in Electron Spin Resonance experiments.

Higher-order corrections due to other eigenstates outside D can be found in the same way as for the non-degenerate case,
$$\left(E_n^{(0)} - H_0 \right) |n^{(1)}\rang = \sum_{k \not\in D} \left(\langle k^{(0)}|V|n^{(0)} \rangle \right) |k^{(0)}\rang.$$

The operator on the left-hand side is not singular when applied to eigenstates outside D, so we can write
$$|n^{(1)}\rangle = \sum_{k \not\in D} \frac{\langle k^{(0)}|V|n^{(0)} \rangle}{E_n^{(0)} - E_k^{(0)}} |k^{(0)}\rang,$$
but the effect on the degenerate states is of $O(\lambda)$.

Near-degenerate states should also be treated similarly, when the original Hamiltonian splits aren't larger than the perturbation in the near-degenerate subspace. An application is found in the nearly free electron model, where near-degeneracy, treated properly, gives rise to an energy gap even for small perturbations. Other eigenstates will only shift the absolute energy of all near-degenerate states simultaneously.

==== Degeneracy lifted to first order ====
Let us consider degenerate energy eigenstates and a perturbation that completely lifts the degeneracy to first order of correction.

The perturbed Hamiltonian is denoted as
$$\hat H = \hat H_0+\lambda\hat V \,,$$
where $\hat H_0$ is the unperturbed Hamiltonian, $\hat V$ is the perturbation operator, and $0<\lambda<1$ is the parameter of the perturbation.

Let us focus on the degeneracy of the $n$-th unperturbed energy $E_n^{(0)}$. We will denote the unperturbed states in this degenerate subspace as $\left|\psi^{(0)}_{nk}\right\rangle$ and the other unperturbed states as $\left|\psi^{(0)}_m\right\rangle$, where $k$ is the index of the unperturbed state in the degenerate subspace and $m\ne n$ represents all other energy eigenstates with energies different from $E_n^{(0)}$. The eventual degeneracy among the other states with $\forall m\ne n$ does not change our arguments. All states $\left|\psi^{(0)}_{nk}\right\rangle$ with various values of $k$ share the same energy $E_n^{(0)}$ when there is no perturbation, i.e., when $\lambda=0$. The energies $E_m^{(0)}$ of the other states $\left|\psi^{(0)}_m\right\rangle$ with $m\ne n$ are all different from $E_n^{(0)}$, but not necessarily unique, i.e. not necessarily always different among themselves.

By $V_{nl,nk}$ and $V_{m,nk}$, we denote the matrix elements of the perturbation operator $\hat V$ in the basis of the unperturbed eigenstates. We assume that the basis vectors $\left|\psi^{(0)}_{nk}\right\rangle$ in the degenerate subspace are chosen such that the matrix elements $V_{nl,nk} \equiv \left\langle\psi^{(0)}_{nl}\right|\hat V\left|\psi^{(0)}_{nk}\right\rangle$ are diagonal. Assuming also that the degeneracy is completely lifted to the first order, i.e. that $E^{(1)}_{nl}\ne E^{(1)}_{nk}$ if $l\ne k$, we have the following formulae for the energy correction to the second order in $\lambda$
$$E_{nk}=E_n^{0}+\lambda V_{nk,nk}
+\lambda^2\sum\limits_{m\ne n}\frac{\left|V_{m,nk}\right|^2}{E_n^{(0)}-E_m^{(0)}}
+\mathcal O(\lambda^3)\,,$$
and for the state correction to the first order in $\lambda$
$$\left|\psi_{nk}\right\rangle =
\left|\psi^{(0)}_{nk}\right\rangle
+\lambda\sum\limits_{m\ne n}\frac{V_{m,nk}}{E^{(0)}_m-E^{(0)}_n}\left(
-\left|\psi^{(0)}_m\right\rangle
+\sum\limits_{l\ne k}\frac{V_{nl,m}}{E^{(1)}_{nl}-E^{(1)}_{nk}}\left|\psi^{(0)}_{nl}\right\rangle
\right)+\mathcal O(\lambda^2) \, .$$

Notice that here the first order correction to the state is orthogonal to the unperturbed state,
$$\left\langle\psi^{(0)}_{nk}|\psi^{(1)}_{nk}\right\rangle = 0 \, .$$

=== Generalization to multi-parameter case ===
The generalization of time-independent perturbation theory to the case where there are multiple small parameters $x^\mu = (x^1,x^2,\cdots)$ in place of λ can be formulated more systematically using the language of differential geometry, which basically defines the derivatives of the quantum states and calculates the perturbative corrections by taking derivatives iteratively at the unperturbed point.

==== Hamiltonian and force operator ====
From the differential geometric point of view, a parameterized Hamiltonian is considered as a function defined on the parameter manifold that maps each particular set of parameters $(x^1,x^2,\cdots)$ to an Hermitian operator H(x^{μ}) that acts on the Hilbert space. The parameters here can be external field, interaction strength, or driving parameters in the quantum phase transition. Let E_{n}(x^{μ}) and $|n(x^\mu)\rangle$ be the n-th eigenenergy and eigenstate of H(x^{μ}) respectively. In the language of differential geometry, the states $|n(x^\mu)\rangle$ form a vector bundle over the parameter manifold, on which derivatives of these states can be defined. The perturbation theory is to answer the following question: given $E_n(x^\mu_0)$ and $|n(x^\mu_0)\rangle$ at an unperturbed reference point $x^\mu_0$, how to estimate the E_{n}(x^{μ}) and $|n(x^\mu)\rangle$ at x^{μ} close to that reference point.

Without loss of generality, the coordinate system can be shifted, such that the reference point $x^\mu_0 = 0$ is set to be the origin. The following linearly parameterized Hamiltonian is frequently used
$$H(x^\mu)= H(0) + x^\mu F_\mu.$$

If the parameters x^{μ} are considered as generalized coordinates, then F_{μ} should be identified as the generalized force operators related to those coordinates. Different indices μ label the different forces along different directions in the parameter manifold. For example, if x^{μ} denotes the external magnetic field in the μ-direction, then F_{μ} should be the magnetization in the same direction.

==== Perturbation theory as power series expansion ====
The validity of perturbation theory lies on the adiabatic assumption, which assumes the eigenenergies and eigenstates of the Hamiltonian are smooth functions of parameters such that their values in the vicinity region can be calculated in power series (like Taylor expansion) of the parameters:

$$\begin{align}
E_n(x^\mu) &= E_n + x^\mu\partial_\mu E_n + \frac{1}{2!}x^\mu x^\nu\partial_\mu\partial_\nu E_n+\cdots \\[1ex]
\left | n(x^\mu) \right \rangle &= \left | n \right \rangle + x^\mu\left|\partial_\mu n\right \rangle + \frac{1}{2!}x^\mu x^\nu\left |\partial_\mu\partial_\nu  n\right \rangle+\cdots
\end{align}$$

Here ∂_{μ} denotes the derivative with respect to x^{μ}. When applying to the state $|\partial_\mu n\rangle$, it should be understood as the covariant derivative if the vector bundle is equipped with non-vanishing connection. All the terms on the right-hand-side of the series are evaluated at x^{μ} = 0, e.g. E_{n} ≡ E_{n}(0) and $|n\rangle\equiv |n(0)\rangle$. This convention will be adopted throughout this subsection, that all functions without the parameter dependence explicitly stated are assumed to be evaluated at the origin. The power series may converge slowly or even not converge when the energy levels are close to each other. The adiabatic assumption breaks down when there is energy level degeneracy, and hence the perturbation theory is not applicable in that case.

==== Hellmann–Feynman theorems ====
The above power series expansion can be readily evaluated if there is a systematic approach to calculate the derivates to any order. Using the chain rule, the derivatives can be broken down to the single derivative on either the energy or the state. The Hellmann–Feynman theorems are used to calculate these single derivatives. The first Hellmann–Feynman theorem gives the derivative of the energy,
$$\partial_\mu E_n=\langle n|\partial_\mu H | n\rangle$$

The second Hellmann–Feynman theorem gives the derivative of the state (resolved by the complete basis with m ≠ n),
$$\langle m|\partial_\mu n\rangle=\frac{\langle m|\partial_\mu H | n\rangle}{E_n-E_m}, \qquad \langle\partial_\mu m| n\rangle=\frac{\langle m|\partial_\mu H | n\rangle}{E_m-E_n}.$$

For the linearly parameterized Hamiltonian, ∂_{μ}H simply stands for the generalized force operator F_{μ}.

The theorems can be simply derived by applying the differential operator ∂_{μ} to both sides of the Schrödinger equation $H|n\rang=E_n|n\rang,$ which reads

$$\partial_\mu H|n\rangle + H|\partial_\mu n\rangle=\partial_\mu E_n|n\rangle+E_n|\partial_\mu n\rangle.$$

Then overlap with the state $\langle m|$ from left and make use of the Schrödinger equation $\langle m|H = \langle m|E_m$ again,

$$\langle m|\partial_\mu H|n\rangle + E_m\langle m|\partial_\mu n\rangle=\partial_\mu E_n\langle m|n\rangle+E_n\langle m|\partial_\mu n\rangle.$$

Given that the eigenstates of the Hamiltonian always form an orthonormal basis $\langle m|n \rangle = \delta_{mn}$, the cases of m = n and m ≠ n can be discussed separately. The first case will lead to the first theorem and the second case to the second theorem, which can be shown immediately by rearranging the terms. With the differential rules given by the Hellmann–Feynman theorems, the perturbative correction to the energies and states can be calculated systematically.

==== Correction of energy and state ====
To the second order, the energy correction reads

$$E_n(x^\mu)=\langle n|H|n\rangle +\langle n|\partial_\mu H|n\rangle  x^\mu + \Re \sum _{m\neq n} \frac{\langle n|\partial_\nu H|m\rangle \langle m|\partial_\mu H|n\rangle}{E_n-E_m}x^\mu x^\nu+\cdots,$$
where $\Re$ denotes the real part function. The first order derivative ∂_{μ}E_{n} is given by the first Hellmann–Feynman theorem directly. To obtain the second order derivative ∂_{μ}∂_{ν}E_{n}, simply applying the differential operator ∂_{μ} to the result of the first order derivative $\langle n|\partial_\nu H|n\rangle$, which reads

$$\partial_\mu\partial_\nu E_n=\langle \partial_\mu n|\partial_\nu H|n\rangle +\langle  n|\partial_\mu\partial_\nu H|n\rangle + \langle  n|\partial_\nu H|\partial_\mu n\rangle.$$

Note that for a linearly parameterized Hamiltonian, there is no second derivative ∂_{μ}∂_{ν}H = 0 on the operator level. Resolve the derivative of state by inserting the complete set of basis,
$$\partial_\mu\partial_\nu E_n=\sum_m\left (\langle \partial_\mu n|m\rangle\langle m|\partial_\nu H|n\rangle + \langle  n|\partial_\nu H|m\rangle\langle m|\partial_\mu n\rangle\right),$$
then all parts can be calculated using the Hellmann–Feynman theorems. In terms of Lie derivatives, $\langle \partial_\mu n|n\rangle = \langle n| \partial_\mu n\rangle = 0$ according to the definition of the connection for the vector bundle. Therefore, the case m = n can be excluded from the summation, which avoids the singularity of the energy denominator. The same procedure can be carried on for higher order derivatives, from which higher order corrections are obtained.

The same computational scheme is applicable for the correction of states. The result to the second order is as follows
$$\begin{align}
\left |n \left (x^\mu \right ) \right\rangle = |n\rangle &+\sum _{m\neq n} \frac{\langle m|\partial_\mu H|n\rangle }{E_n-E_m}|m\rangle x^\mu \\
&+\left(\sum_{m\neq n} \sum_{l\neq n} \frac{\langle m|\partial_\mu H|l\rangle \langle l|\partial_\nu H|n\rangle }{(E_n-E_m)(E_n-E_l)}|m\rangle -\sum _{m\neq n} \frac{\langle m|\partial_\mu H|n\rangle \langle n|\partial_\nu H|n\rangle }{(E_n-E_m)^2}|m\rangle -\frac{1}{2}\sum _{m\neq n} \frac{\langle n|\partial_\mu H|m\rangle \langle m|\partial_\nu H|n\rangle }{(E_n-E_m)^2}|n\rangle \right)x^\mu x^\nu+\cdots.
\end{align}$$

Both energy derivatives and state derivatives will be involved in deduction. Whenever a state derivative is encountered, resolve it by inserting the complete set of basis, then the Hellmann-Feynman theorem is applicable. Because differentiation can be calculated systematically, the series expansion approach to the perturbative corrections can be coded on computers with symbolic processing software like Mathematica.

==== Effective Hamiltonian ====
Let H(0) be the Hamiltonian completely restricted either in the low-energy subspace $\mathcal{H}_L$ or in the high-energy subspace $\mathcal{H}_H$, such that there is no matrix element in H(0) connecting the low- and the high-energy subspaces, i.e. $\langle m|H(0)|l\rangle=0$ if $m\in \mathcal{H}_L, l\in\mathcal{H}_H$. Let F_{μ} = ∂_{μ}H be the coupling terms connecting the subspaces. Then when the high energy degrees of freedoms are integrated out, the effective Hamiltonian in the low energy subspace reads

$$H_{mn}^{\text{eff}}\left(x^{\mu}\right)=\langle m|H|n\rangle +\delta_{nm}\langle m|\partial _{\mu } H |n\rangle x^{\mu}+\frac{1}{2!}\sum _{l\in\mathcal{H}_H} \left(\frac{\langle m|\partial_{\mu}H|l\rangle \langle l|\partial _{\nu}H|n\rangle }{E_m-E_l}+\frac{\langle m|\partial _{\nu }H|l\rangle \langle l|\partial_{\mu}H|n\rangle }{E_n-E_l}\right)x^{\mu}x^{\nu}+\cdots.$$

Here $m,n\in\mathcal{H}_L$ are restricted in the low energy subspace. The above result can be derived by power series expansion of $\langle m|H(x^\mu)|n \rangle$.

In a formal way it is possible to define an effective Hamiltonian that gives exactly the low-lying energy states and wavefunctions. In practice, some kind of approximation (perturbation theory) is generally required.

== Time-dependent perturbation theory ==
=== Method of variation of constants ===
Time-dependent perturbation theory, initiated by Paul Dirac and further developed by John Archibald Wheeler, Richard Feynman, and Freeman Dyson, studies the effect of a time-dependent perturbation V(t) applied to a time-independent Hamiltonian H_{0}. It is an extremely valuable tool for calculating the properties of any physical system. It is used for the quantitative description of phenomena as diverse as proton-proton scattering, photo-ionization of materials, scattering of electrons off lattice defects in a conductor, scattering of neutrons off nuclei, electric susceptibilities of materials, neutron absorption cross sections in a nuclear reactor, and much more.

Since the perturbed Hamiltonian is time-dependent, so are its energy levels and eigenstates. Thus, the goals of time-dependent perturbation theory are slightly different from time-independent perturbation theory. One is interested in the following quantities:

- The time-dependent expectation value of some observable A, for a given initial state.
- The time-dependent expansion coefficients (w.r.t. a given time-dependent state) of those basis states that are energy eigenkets (eigenvectors) in the unperturbed system.

The first quantity is important because it gives rise to the classical result of an A measurement performed on a macroscopic number of copies of the perturbed system. For example, we could take A to be the displacement in the x-direction of the electron in a hydrogen atom, in which case the expected value, when multiplied by an appropriate coefficient, gives the time-dependent dielectric polarization of a hydrogen gas. With an appropriate choice of perturbation (i.e. an oscillating electric potential), this allows one to calculate the AC permittivity of the gas.

The second quantity looks at the time-dependent probability of occupation for each eigenstate. This is particularly useful in laser physics, where one is interested in the populations of different atomic states in a gas when a time-dependent electric field is applied. These probabilities are also useful for calculating the "quantum broadening" of spectral lines (see line broadening) and particle decay in particle physics and nuclear physics.

We will briefly examine the method behind Dirac's formulation of time-dependent perturbation theory. Choose an energy basis ${|n\rangle}$ for the unperturbed system. (We drop the (0) superscripts for the eigenstates, because it is not useful to speak of energy levels and eigenstates for the perturbed system.)

If the unperturbed system is an eigenstate (of the Hamiltonian) $|j\rangle$ at time t = 0, its state at subsequent times varies only by a phase (in the Schrödinger picture, where state vectors evolve in time and operators are constant),
$$|j(t)\rang = e^{-iE_j t /\hbar} |j\rang ~.$$

Now, introduce a time-dependent perturbing Hamiltonian V(t). The Hamiltonian of the perturbed system is
$$H = H_0 + V(t) ~.$$
Let $|\psi(t)\rang$ denote the quantum state of the perturbed system at time t. It obeys the time-dependent Schrödinger equation,
$$H |\psi(t)\rang = i\hbar \frac{\partial}{\partial t} |\psi(t)\rang ~.$$

The quantum state at each instant can be expressed as a linear combination of the complete eigenbasis of $|n\rang$:

$|\psi(t)\rang = \sum_n c_n(t) e^{- i E_n t / \hbar} |n\rang ~,$	1

where the c_{n}(t)s are to be determined complex functions of t which we will refer to as amplitudes (strictly speaking, they are the amplitudes in the Dirac picture).

We have explicitly extracted the exponential phase factors $\exp(- i E_n t / \hbar)$ on the right hand side. This is only a matter of convention, and may be done without loss of generality. The reason we go to this trouble is that when the system starts in the state $|j\rang$ and no perturbation is present, the amplitudes have the convenient property that, for all t, c_{j}(t) = 1 and c_{n}(t) = 0 if n ≠ j.

The square of the absolute amplitude c_{n}(t) is the probability that the system is in state n at time t, since
$$\left|c_n(t)\right|^2 = \left|\lang n|\psi(t)\rang\right|^2 ~.$$

Plugging into the Schrödinger equation and using the fact that ∂/∂t acts by a product rule, one obtains
$$\sum_n \left( i\hbar \frac{dc_n}{dt} - c_n(t) V(t) \right) e^{- i E_n t /\hbar} |n\rang = 0  ~.$$

By resolving the identity in front of V and multiplying through by the bra $\langle n|$ on the left, this can be reduced to a set of coupled differential equations for the amplitudes,
$$\frac{dc_n}{dt} = \frac{-i}{\hbar} \sum_k \lang n|V(t)|k\rang \,c_k(t)\, e^{-i(E_k - E_n)t/\hbar} ~.$$

where we have used equation (1) to evaluate the sum on n in the second term, then used the fact that $\langle k| \Psi(t) \rangle = c_k(t) e^{-iE_kt/\hbar}$.

The matrix elements of V play a similar role as in time-independent perturbation theory, being proportional to the rate at which amplitudes are shifted between states. Note, however, that the direction of the shift is modified by the exponential phase factor. Over times much longer than the energy difference E_{k} − E_{n}, the phase winds around 0 several times. If the time-dependence of V is sufficiently slow, this may cause the state amplitudes to oscillate. (For example, such oscillations are useful for managing radiative transitions in a laser.)

Up to this point, we have made no approximations, so this set of differential equations is exact. By supplying appropriate initial values c_{n}(t), we could in principle find an exact (i.e., non-perturbative) solution. This is easily done when there are only two energy levels (n = 1, 2), and this solution is useful for modelling systems like the ammonia molecule.

However, exact solutions are difficult to find when there are many energy levels, and one instead looks for perturbative solutions. These may be obtained by expressing the equations in an integral form,
$$c_n(t) = c_n(0) - \frac{i}{\hbar} \sum_k \int_0^t dt' \;\lang n|V(t')|k\rang \,c_k(t')\, e^{-i(E_k - E_n)t'/\hbar} ~.$$

Repeatedly substituting this expression for c_{n} back into right hand side, yields an iterative solution,
$$c_n(t) = c_n^{(0)} + c_n^{(1)} + c_n^{(2)} + \cdots$$
where, for example, the first-order term is
$$c_n^{(1)}(t) = \frac{-i}{\hbar} \sum_k \int_0^t dt' \;\lang n|V(t')|k\rang \, c_k^{(0)} \, e^{-i(E_k - E_n)t'/\hbar} ~.$$
To the same approximation, the summation in the above expression can be removed since in the unperturbed state $c_k^{(0)}=\delta_{kn}$ so that we have
$$c_n^{(1)}(t) = \frac{-i}{\hbar}  \int_0^t dt' \;\lang n|V(t')|k\rang \, e^{-i(E_k - E_n)t'/\hbar} ~.$$

Several further results follow from this, such as Fermi's golden rule, which relates the rate of transitions between quantum states to the density of states at particular energies; or the Dyson series, obtained by applying the iterative method to the time evolution operator, which is one of the starting points for the method of Feynman diagrams.

=== Method of Dyson series ===
Time-dependent perturbations can be reorganized through the technique of the Dyson series. The Schrödinger equation
$$H(t)|\psi(t)\rangle=i\hbar\frac{\partial |\psi(t)\rangle}{\partial t}$$
has the formal solution
$$|\psi(t)\rangle = T\exp{\left[-\frac{i}{\hbar}\int_{t_0}^t dt'H(t')\right]}|\psi(t_0)\rangle ~,$$
where T is the time ordering operator,
$$TA(t_1)A(t_2)= \begin{cases} A(t_1)A(t_2) & t_1>t_2 \\ A(t_2)A(t_1) & t_2>t_1\end{cases}~.$$
Thus, the exponential represents the following Dyson series,
$$|\psi(t)\rangle=\left[1-\frac{i}{\hbar}\int_{t_0}^t dt_1H(t_1)-\frac{1}{\hbar^2}\int_{t_0}^t dt_1\int_{t_0}^{t_1} dt_2H(t_1)H(t_2)+\ldots\right]|\psi(t_0)\rangle  ~.$$
Note that in the second term, the 1/2! factor exactly cancels the double contribution due to the time-ordering operator, etc.

Consider the following perturbation problem
$$[H_0+\lambda V(t)]|\psi(t)\rangle=i\hbar\frac{\partial |\psi(t)\rangle}{\partial t}   ~,$$
assuming that the parameter λ is small and that the problem $H_0|n\rangle=E_n|n\rangle$ has been solved.

Perform the following unitary transformation to the interaction picture (or Dirac picture),
$$|\psi(t)\rangle = e^{-\frac{i}{\hbar}H_0(t-t_0)}|\psi_I(t)\rangle ~.$$
Consequently, the Schrödinger equation simplifies to
$$\lambda e^{\frac{i}{\hbar}H_0(t-t_0)}V(t)e^{-\frac{i}{\hbar}H_0(t-t_0)}|\psi_I(t)\rangle=i\hbar\frac{\partial |\psi_I(t)\rangle}{\partial t} ~,$$
so it is solved through the above Dyson series,
$$|\psi_I(t)\rangle=\left[1-\frac{i\lambda}{\hbar}\int_{t_0}^t dt_1 e^{\frac{i}{\hbar}H_0(t_1-t_0)}V(t_1)e^{-\frac{i}{\hbar}H_0(t_1-t_0)}-\frac{\lambda^2}{\hbar^2}\int_{t_0}^t dt_1\int_{t_0}^{t_1} dt_2e^{\frac{i}{\hbar}H_0(t_1-t_0)}V(t_1)e^{-\frac{i}{\hbar}H_0(t_1-t_0)} e^{\frac{i}{\hbar}H_0(t_2-t_0)}V(t_2)e^{-\frac{i}{\hbar}H_0(t_2-t_0)}+\ldots\right]|\psi(t_0)\rangle ~,$$
as a perturbation series with small λ.

Using the solution of the unperturbed problem $H_0|n\rangle=E_n|n\rangle$ and $\sum_n|n\rangle\langle n|=1$ (for the sake of simplicity assume a pure discrete spectrum), yields, to first order,
$$|\psi_I(t)\rangle=\left[1-\frac{i\lambda}{\hbar}\sum_m\sum_n\int_{t_0}^t dt_1\langle m|V(t_1)| n\rangle e^{-\frac{i}{\hbar}(E_n-E_m)(t_1-t_0)}|m\rangle\langle n|+\ldots\right]|\psi(t_0)\rangle~.$$

Thus, the system, initially in the unperturbed state $|\alpha\rangle = |\psi(t_0)\rangle$, by dint of the perturbation can go into the state $|\beta\rangle$. The corresponding transition probability amplitude to first order is
$$A_{\alpha\beta}=-\frac{i\lambda}{\hbar}\int_{t_0}^t dt_1\langle\beta|V(t_1)|\alpha\rangle e^{-\frac{i}{\hbar}(E_\alpha-E_\beta)(t_1-t_0)} ~,$$
as detailed in the previous section——while the corresponding transition probability to a continuum is furnished by Fermi's golden rule.

As an aside, note that time-independent perturbation theory is also organized inside this time-dependent perturbation theory Dyson series. To see this, write the unitary evolution operator, obtained from the above Dyson series, as
$$U(t)=1-\frac{i\lambda}{\hbar}\int_{t_0}^t dt_1 e^{\frac{i}{\hbar}H_0(t_1-t_0)} V(t_1) e^{-\frac{i}{\hbar} H_0(t_1-t_0)} - \frac{\lambda^2}{\hbar^2} \int_{t_0}^t dt_1 \int_{t_0}^{t_1} dt_2 e^{\frac{i}{\hbar}H_0(t_1-t_0)} V(t_1) e^{-\frac{i}{\hbar}H_0(t_1-t_0)} e^{\frac{i}{\hbar}H_0(t_2-t_0)}V(t_2)e^{-\frac{i}{\hbar}H_0(t_2-t_0)} + \cdots$$
and take the perturbation V to be time-independent.

Using the identity resolution
$$\sum_n |n\rangle \langle n| = 1$$
with $H_0|n\rangle = E_n|n\rangle$ for a pure discrete spectrum, write
$$\begin{align}U(t)= 1 &- \left [ \frac{i\lambda}{\hbar}\int_{t_0}^t dt_1 \sum_m \sum_n \langle m| V |n\rangle e^{-\frac{i}{\hbar}(E_n-E_m)(t_1-t_0)}|m\rangle\langle n| \right ] \\[5mu]
&- \left [ \frac{\lambda^2}{\hbar^2} \int_{t_0}^t dt_1\int_{t_0}^{t_1} dt_2\sum_m\sum_n\sum_q e^{-\frac{i}{\hbar}(E_n-E_m)(t_1-t_0)}\langle m|V|n\rangle  \langle n|V|q\rangle e^{-\frac{i}{\hbar}(E_q-E_n)(t_2-t_0)}|m\rangle\langle q| \right ] + \cdots
\end{align}$$

It is evident that, at second order, one must sum on all the intermediate states. Assume $t_0=0$ and the asymptotic limit of larger times. This means that, at each contribution of the perturbation series, one has to add a multiplicative factor $e^{-\epsilon t}$ in the integrands for ε arbitrarily small. Thus the limit t → ∞ gives back the final state of the system by eliminating all oscillating terms, but keeping the secular ones. The integrals are thus computable, and, separating the diagonal terms from the others yields
$$\begin{align}
U(t)=1 &-\frac{i\lambda}{\hbar}\sum_n\langle n|V|n\rangle t-\frac{i\lambda^2}{\hbar}\sum_{m\neq n}\frac{\langle n|V|m\rangle\langle m|V|n\rangle}{E_n-E_m}t-\frac{1}{2}\frac{\lambda^2}{\hbar^2}\sum_{m,n}\langle n|V|m\rangle\langle m|V|n\rangle t^2+\cdots \\
&+\lambda\sum_{m\neq n}\frac{\langle m|V|n\rangle}{E_n-E_m}|m\rangle\langle n|
+\lambda^2\sum_{m\neq n}\sum_{q\neq n}\sum_n\frac{\langle m|V|n\rangle\langle n|V|q\rangle}{(E_n-E_m)(E_q-E_n)}|m\rangle\langle q|+\cdots
\end{align}$$
where the time secular series yields the eigenvalues of the perturbed problem specified above, recursively; whereas the remaining time-constant part yields the corrections to the stationary eigenfunctions also given above ($|n(\lambda)\rangle= U(0; \lambda)|n\rangle )$.)

The unitary evolution operator is applicable to arbitrary eigenstates of the unperturbed problem and, in this case, yields a secular series that holds at small times.

== Strong perturbation theory ==
In a similar way as for small perturbations, it is possible to develop a strong perturbation theory. Consider as usual the Schrödinger equation

$$H(t)|\psi(t)\rangle=i\hbar\frac{\partial |\psi(t)\rangle}{\partial t}$$

and we consider the question if a dual Dyson series exists that applies in the limit of a perturbation increasingly large. This question can be answered in an affirmative way and the series is the well-known adiabatic series. This approach is quite general and can be shown in the following way. Consider the perturbation problem

$$[H_0+\lambda V(t)]|\psi(t)\rangle=i\hbar\frac{\partial |\psi(t)\rangle}{\partial t}$$

being λ→ ∞. Our aim is to find a solution in the form

$$|\psi\rangle=|\psi_0\rangle+\frac{1}{\lambda}|\psi_1\rangle+\frac{1}{\lambda^2}|\psi_2\rangle+\ldots$$

but a direct substitution into the above equation fails to produce useful results. This situation can be adjusted making a rescaling of the time variable as $\tau=\lambda t$ producing the following meaningful equations

$$\begin{align}
V(t)|\psi_0\rangle &= i\hbar\frac{\partial|\psi_0\rangle}{\partial\tau} \\[1ex]
V(t)|\psi_1\rangle+H_0|\psi_0\rangle &= i\hbar\frac{\partial|\psi_1\rangle}{\partial\tau} \\[1ex]
&\;\,\vdots
\end{align}$$

that can be solved once we know the solution of the leading order equation. But we know that in this case we can use the adiabatic approximation. When $V(t)$ does not depend on time one gets the Wigner-Kirkwood series that is often used in statistical mechanics. Indeed, in this case we introduce the unitary transformation

$$|\psi(t)\rangle = e^{-\frac{i}{\hbar}\lambda V(t-t_0)}|\psi_F(t)\rangle$$

that defines a free picture as we are trying to eliminate the interaction term. Now, in dual way with respect to the small perturbations, we have to solve the Schrödinger equation

$$e^{\frac{i}{\hbar}\lambda V(t-t_0)} H_0 e^{-\frac{i}{\hbar}\lambda V(t-t_0)} |\psi_F(t)\rangle = i \hbar \frac{\partial |\psi_F(t)\rangle}{\partial t}$$

and we see that the expansion parameter λ appears only into the exponential and so, the corresponding Dyson series, a dual Dyson series, is meaningful at large λs and is

$$|\psi_F(t)\rangle=\left[1-\frac{i}{\hbar}\int_{t_0}^t dt_1 e^{\frac{i}{\hbar}\lambda V(t_1-t_0)} H_0 e^{-\frac{i}{\hbar}\lambda V(t_1-t_0)} -\frac{1}{\hbar^2}\int_{t_0}^t dt_1\int_{t_0}^{t_1} dt_2e^{\frac{i}{\hbar}\lambda V(t_1-t_0)} H_0e^{-\frac{i}{\hbar}\lambda V(t_1-t_0)} e^{\frac{i}{\hbar}\lambda V(t_2-t_0)}H_0e^{-\frac{i}{\hbar}\lambda V(t_2-t_0)} + \cdots\right] |\psi(t_0)\rangle.$$

After the rescaling in time $\tau = \lambda t$ we can see that this is indeed a series in $1/\lambda$ justifying in this way the name of dual Dyson series. The reason is that we have obtained this series simply interchanging H_{0} and V and we can go from one to another applying this exchange. This is called duality principle in perturbation theory. The choice $H_0=p^2/2m$ yields, as already said, a Wigner-Kirkwood series that is a gradient expansion. The Wigner-Kirkwood series is a semiclassical series with eigenvalues given exactly as for WKB approximation.

== Examples ==
=== Example of first-order perturbation theory – ground-state energy of the quartic oscillator ===
Consider the quantum harmonic oscillator with the quartic potential perturbation and the Hamiltonian
$$H = -\frac{\hbar^2}{2 m} \frac{\partial^2}{\partial x^2}+\frac{m \omega^2 x^2}{2}+\lambda x^4.$$

The ground state of the harmonic oscillator is
$$\psi_0 = \left( \frac{\alpha}{\pi}\right)^\frac{1}{4}e^{-\alpha x^2/2}$$
($\alpha = m \omega/\hbar$), and the energy of unperturbed ground state is
$$E_0^{(0)} = \tfrac{1}{2}\hbar \omega$$

Using the first-order correction formula, we get
$$E_0^{(1)} = \lambda \left( \frac{\alpha}{\pi}\right)^\frac{1}{2}\int e^{-\alpha x^2/2}  x^4 e^{-\alpha x^2/2} dx = \lambda \left( \frac{\alpha}{\pi}\right)^\frac{1}{2} \frac{\partial^2}{\partial \alpha^2} \int e^{-\alpha x^2} dx,$$
or
$$E_0^{(1)} = \lambda \left( \frac{\alpha}{\pi}\right)^\frac{1}{2}\frac{\partial^2}{\partial \alpha^2}\left( \frac{\pi}{\alpha}\right)^\frac{1}{2}=\lambda \frac{3}{4}\frac{1}{\alpha^2}=\frac{3}{4}\frac{\hbar^2 \lambda}{m^2 \omega^2}.$$

=== Example of first- and second-order perturbation theory – quantum pendulum ===
Consider the quantum-mathematical pendulum with the Hamiltonian
$$H=-\frac{\hbar^2}{2 m a^2} \frac{\partial^2}{\partial \phi^2}-\lambda \cos \phi$$
with the potential energy $-\lambda \cos \phi$ taken as the perturbation i.e.
$$V=-\cos \phi.$$

The unperturbed normalized quantum wave functions are those of the rigid rotor and are given by
$$\psi_n(\phi)=\frac{e^{i n \phi}}{\sqrt{2 \pi}},$$
and the energies
$$E_n^{(0)}=\frac{\hbar^2 n^2}{2 m a^2}.$$

The first-order energy correction to the rotor due to the potential energy is
$$E_n^{(1)}=-\frac{1}{2\pi}\int e^{-i n \phi} \cos \phi  e^{i n \phi}=-\frac{1}{2\pi} \int \cos \phi = 0.$$

Using the formula for the second-order correction, one gets
$$E_n^{(2)}=\frac{m a^2}{2 \pi^2 \hbar^2} \sum_k \frac{\left|\int e^{-i k \phi} \cos \phi  e^{i n \phi} \, d\phi \right|^2}{n^2-k^2},$$
or
$$E_n^{(2)}=\frac{ m a^2}{2 \hbar^2 } \sum_k \frac{\left|\left(\delta_{n,1-k}+\delta_{n,-1-k}\right)\right|^2}{n^2-k^2},$$
or
$$E_n^{(2)}=\frac{ m a^2}{ 2 \hbar^2 }\left ( \frac{1}{2n-1}+\frac{1}{-2n-1}\right ) = \frac{ m a^2}{\hbar^2 }\frac{1}{4 n^2-1}.$$

=== Potential energy as a perturbation ===
When the unperturbed state is a free motion of a particle with kinetic energy $E$, the solution of the Schrödinger equation
$$\nabla^2 \psi^{(0)} + k^2 \psi^{(0)}=0$$
corresponds to plane waves with wavenumber $k = \sqrt{2mE / \hbar^2}$. If there is a weak potential energy $U(x,y,z)$ present in the space, in the first approximation, the perturbed state is described by the equation
$$\nabla^2 \psi^{(1)} + k^2 \psi^{(1)}=\frac{2mU}{\hbar^2}\psi^{(0)},$$
whose particular integral is
$$\psi^{(1)}(x,y,z) = -\frac{m}{2\pi\hbar^2} \int \psi^{(0)} U(x',y',z')\frac{e^{ikr}}{r}\,dx'dy'dz',$$
where $r^2 = (x-x')^2+(y-y')^2+(z-z')^2$. In the two-dimensional case, the solution is
$$\psi^{(1)}(x,y) = -\frac{im}{2\hbar^2} \int \psi^{(0)} U(x',y')H_0^{(1)}(kr)\,dx'dy',$$
where $r^2=(x-x')^2+(y-y')^2$ and $H_0^{(1)}$ is the Hankel function of the first kind. In the one-dimensional case, the solution is
$$\psi^{(1)}(x) = -\frac{im}{\hbar^2} \int \psi^{(0)} U(x') \frac{e^{ikr}}{k}\,dx',$$
where $r=|x-x'|$.

== Applications ==
- Rabi cycle – Quantum mechanical phenomenon
- Fermi's golden rule – Transition rate formula
- Muon spin spectroscopy – Experimental technique in physics
- Perturbed angular correlation – Measurement method in nuclear physics
