= Fractal derivative =

Generalization of derivative to fractals

In applied mathematics and mathematical analysis, the fractal derivative or Hausdorff derivative is a non-Newtonian generalization of the derivative dealing with the measurement of fractals, defined in fractal geometry. Fractal derivatives were created for the study of anomalous diffusion, by which traditional approaches fail to factor in the fractal nature of the media. A fractal measure t is scaled according to t^{α}. Such a derivative is local, in contrast to the similarly applied fractional derivative. Fractal calculus is formulated as a generalization of standard calculus.

== Physical background ==
Porous media, aquifers, turbulence, and other media usually exhibit fractal properties. Classical diffusion or dispersion laws based on random walks in free space (essentially the same result variously known as Fick's laws of diffusion, Darcy's law, and Fourier's law) are not applicable to fractal media. To address this, concepts such as distance and velocity must be redefined for fractal media; in particular, scales for space and time are to be transformed according to (x^{β}, t^{α}). Elementary physical concepts such as velocity are redefined as follows for fractal spacetime (x^{β}, t^{α}):

$$v' = \frac{dx'}{dt'}=\frac{dx^\beta}{dt^\alpha}\,,\quad \alpha,\beta>0$$,

where S^{α,β} represents the fractal spacetime with scaling indices α and β. The traditional definition of velocity makes no sense in the non-differentiable fractal spacetime.

== Definition ==
Based on above discussion, the concept of the fractal derivative of a function f(t) with respect to a fractal measure t has been introduced as follows:

$$\frac{\partial f(t)}{\partial t^\alpha}=\lim_{t_1 \rightarrow t}\frac{f(t_1)-f(t)}{t_1^\alpha-t^\alpha}\,, \quad \alpha>0$$,

A more general definition is given by

$$\frac{\partial^\beta f(t)}{\partial t^\alpha}=\lim_{t_1 \rightarrow t}\frac{f^\beta (t_1)-f^\beta (t)}{t_1^\alpha-t^\alpha}\,, \quad\alpha>0, \beta>0$$.

For a function y(t) on $F^{\alpha}$-perfect fractal set F the fractal derivative or $F^{\alpha}$-derivative of y(t) at t is defined by

$$D_{F}^{\alpha}y(t)=\left\{
\begin{array}{ll}
\underset{ x\rightarrow t}{F_{-}\lim}~\frac{y(x)-y(t)}
{S_{F}^{\alpha}(x)-S_{F}^{\alpha}(t)}, & \text{if}~ t\in F; \\
0, & \text{otherwise}.
\end{array}
\right.$$.

=== Motivation ===
The derivatives of a function f can be defined in terms of the coefficients a_{k} in the Taylor series expansion:

$f(x)=\sum_{k=1}^\infin a_k\cdot(x-x_0)^k=\sum_{k=1}^\infin {1 \over k!}{d^kf \over dx^k}(x_0)\cdot(x-x_0)^k=f(x_0)+f'(x_0)\cdot(x-x_0)+o(x-x_0)$

From this approach one can directly obtain:

$f'(x_0)={f(x)-f(x_0)-o(x-x_0) \over x-x_0}=\lim_{x \to x_0}{f(x)-f(x_0) \over x-x_0}$

This can be generalized approximating f with functions (x^{α}-(x_{0})^{α})^{k}:

$f(x)=\sum_{k=1}^\infin b_k\cdot(x^\alpha-x_0^\alpha)^k=f(x_0)+b_1\cdot(x^\alpha-x_0^\alpha)+o(x^\alpha-x_0^\alpha)$

Note that the lowest order coefficient still has to be b_{0}=f(x_{0}), since it's still the constant approximation of the function f at x_{0}.

Again one can directly obtain:

$b_1=\lim_{x \to x_0}{f(x)-f(x_0) \over x^\alpha-x_0^\alpha} \overset{\underset{\mathrm{def}}{}}{=} {df \over dx^\alpha}(x_0)$

The Fractal Maclaurin series of f(t) with fractal support F is as follows:

$f(t)=\sum_{m=0}^{\infty} \frac{(D_{F}^{\alpha})^{m}f(t)|_{t=0}}{m!} (S_{F}^{\alpha}(t))^{m}$

== Properties ==
=== Expansion coefficients ===
Just like in the Taylor series expansion, the coefficients b_{k} can be expressed in terms of the fractal derivatives of order k of f:

$b_k={1 \over k!} \biggl({d \over dx^\alpha}\biggr)^kf(x=x_0)$

Proof idea: Assuming

$({d \over dx^\alpha})^kf(x=x_0)$

exists, b_{k} can be written as

$b_k=a_k \cdot({d \over dx^\alpha})^kf(x=x_0)$

One can now use

$f(x) = (x^\alpha-x_0^\alpha)^n \Rightarrow ({d \over dx^\alpha})^kf(x=x_0)=n!\delta_n^k$

and since

$b_n\overset{\underset{\mathrm{!}}{}}{=}1 \Rightarrow a_n ={1 \over n!}$

=== Chain rule ===
If for a given function f both the derivative Df and the fractal derivative D_{α}f exist, one can find an analog to the chain rule:

${df \over dx^\alpha} = {df \over dx}{dx \over dx^\alpha}={1 \over \alpha}x^{1-\alpha}{df \over dx}$

The last step is motivated by the implicit function theorem which, under appropriate conditions, gives us

$\frac{dx}{dx^{\alpha}} = (\frac{dx^{\alpha}}{dx})^{-1}$

Similarly for the more general definition:

${d^\beta f \over d^\alpha x} = {d(f^\beta) \over d^\alpha x} = {1 \over \alpha} x^{1-\alpha}\beta f^{\beta - 1}(x)f'(x)$

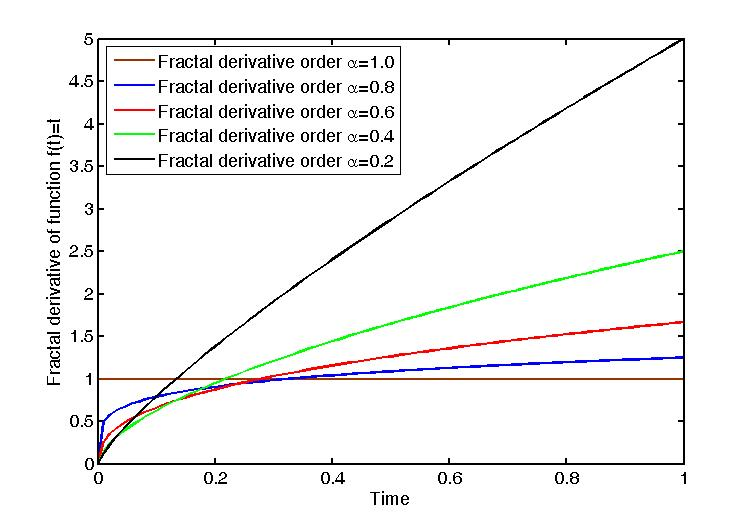
Fractal derivative for function f(t) = t, with derivative order is α ∈ (0,1]

== Application in anomalous diffusion ==
As an alternative modeling approach to the classical Fick's second law, the fractal derivative is used to derive a linear anomalous transport-diffusion equation underlying anomalous diffusion process,

$$\frac{d u (x,t)}{d t^\alpha}= D \frac{\partial }{\partial x^\beta} \left(\frac{\partial u(x,t)}{\partial x^\beta}\right), \quad (1)$$

$$u(x, 0)=\delta(x)$$

where 0 < α < 2, 0 < β < 1, $x \in \R$, and δ(x) is the Dirac delta function.

To obtain the fundamental solution, we apply the transformation of variables

$$t'=t^\alpha\,,\quad x'=x^\beta.$$

then the equation (1) becomes the normal diffusion form equation, the solution of (1) has the stretched Gaussian kernel:

$$u(x,t)=\frac{1}{2\sqrt{\pi t^\alpha}} e^{-\frac{x^{2 \beta}}{4t^\alpha}}$$

The mean squared displacement of above fractal derivative diffusion equation has the asymptote:

$$\left\langle x^2 (t) \right\rangle\propto t^{(3 \alpha-\alpha \beta)/2 \beta}.$$

== Fractal-fractional calculus ==
The fractal derivative is connected to the classical derivative if the first derivative exists. In this case,

$$\frac{\partial f(t)}{\partial t^\alpha}=\lim_{t_1 \rightarrow t}\frac{f(t_1)-f(t)}{t_1^\alpha-t^\alpha}\ =\frac{d f(t)}{d t}\frac{1}{\alpha t^{\alpha-1}}, \quad \alpha>0$$.

However, due to the differentiability property of an integral, fractional derivatives are differentiable, thus the following new concept was introduced by Prof Abdon Atangana from South Africa.

The following differential operators were introduced and applied very recently. Supposing that y(t) be continuous and fractal differentiable on (a, b) with order β, several definitions of a fractal–fractional derivative of y(t) hold with order α in the Riemann–Liouville sense:

- Having power law type kernel:

$^{FFP}D_{0,t}^{\alpha, \beta} \Big(y(t)\Big)=\dfrac{1}{\Gamma(m-\alpha)} \dfrac{d}{dt^{\beta}} \int_0^t (t-s)^{m-\alpha-1} y(s) ds$

- Having exponentially decaying type kernel:

$^{FFE}D_{0,t}^{\alpha, \beta} \Big(y(t)\Big)=\dfrac{M(\alpha)}{1-\alpha} \dfrac{d}{dt^{\beta}} \int_0^t \exp \Big(- \dfrac{\alpha}{1-\alpha} (t-s) \Big) y(s) ds$,

- Having generalized Mittag-Leffler type kernel:

${}_a^{FFM} D_t^\alpha f(t)=\frac{AB(\alpha)}{1-\alpha}\frac {d} {dt^\beta} \int_a^t f(\tau) E_\alpha \left(-\alpha\frac{\left(t-\tau\right)^\alpha}{1-\alpha}\right)\,d\tau\,.$

The above differential operators each have an associated fractal-fractional integral operator, as follows:

- Power law type kernel:

$^{FFP}J_{0,t}^{\alpha, \beta} \Big(y(t)\Big)=\dfrac{\beta}{\Gamma(\alpha)} \int_0^t (t-s)^{\alpha-1} s^{\beta-1} y(s) ds$

- Exponentially decaying type kernel:

$^{FFE}J_{0,t}^{\alpha, \beta} \Big(y(t)\Big)=\dfrac{\alpha \beta}{M(\alpha)} \int_0^t s^{\beta-1} y(s) ds+\dfrac{\beta (1-\alpha)t^{\beta -1} y(t)}{M(\alpha)}$.

- Generalized Mittag-Leffler type kernel:

$^{FFM}J_{0,t}^{\alpha, \beta} \Big(y(t)\Big)=\dfrac{\alpha \beta}{\Gamma(\alpha)AB(\alpha)} \int_0^t s^{\beta-1} y(s) (t-s)^{\alpha-1} ds+\dfrac{\beta (1-\alpha)t^{\beta -1} y(t)}{AB(\alpha)}$.

FFM refers to fractal-fractional with the generalized Mittag-Leffler kernel.

== Fractal non-local calculus ==
- Fractal analogue of the right-sided Riemann-Liouville fractional integral of order $\beta\in \mathbb{R}$ of f is defined by:

${x}\mathcal{I}_{b}^{\beta}f(x)=\frac{1}{\Gamma(\beta)}\int_{x}^{b} \frac{f(t)}{(S_{F}^{\alpha}(t)-S_{F}^{\alpha}(x))^{1-\beta}}d_{F}^{\alpha}t$.

- Fractal analogue of the left-sided Riemann-Liouville fractional integral of order $\beta\in \mathbb{R}$ of f is defined by:

${a}\mathcal{I}_{x}^{\beta}f(x)=\frac{1}{\Gamma(\beta)}\int_{a}^{x} \frac{f(t)}{(S_{F}^{\alpha}(x)-S_{F}^{\alpha}(t))^{1-\beta}}d_{F}^{\alpha}t.$

- Fractal analogue of the right-sided Riemann-Liouville fractional derivative of order $\beta\in \mathbb{R}$ of f is defined by:

${x}\mathcal{D}_{b}^{\beta}f(x)=\frac{1}{\Gamma(n-\beta)} (-D_{F}^{\alpha})^{n}\int_{x}^{b} \frac{f(t)}{(S_{F}^{\alpha}(t)-S_{F}^{\alpha}(x))^{-n+\beta+1}}d_{F}^{\alpha}t$

- Fractal analogue of the left-sided Riemann-Liouville fractional derivative of order $\beta\in \mathbb{R}$ of f is defined by:

${a}\mathcal{D}_{x}^{\beta}f(x)=\frac{1}{\Gamma(n-\beta)} (D_{F}^{\alpha})^{n}\int_{a}^{x} \frac{f(t)}{(S_{F}^{\alpha}(x)-S_{F}^{\alpha}(t))^{-n+\beta+1}}d_{F}^{\alpha}t$

- Fractal analogue of the right-sided Caputo fractional derivative of order $\beta\in \mathbb{R}$ of f is defined by:

${x}^{C}\mathcal{D}_{b}^{\beta}f(x)=\frac{1}{\Gamma(n-\beta)} \int_{x}^{b} (S_{F}^{\alpha}(t)-S_{F}^{\alpha}(x))^{n-\beta-1} (-D_{F}^{\alpha})^{n}f(t)d_{F}^{\alpha}t$

- Fractal analogue of the left-sided Caputo fractional derivative of order $\beta\in \mathbb{R}$ of f is defined by:

${a}^{C}\mathcal{D}_{x}^{\beta}f(x)=\frac{1}{\Gamma(n-\beta)} \int_{a}^{x} (S_{F}^{\alpha}(x)-S_{F}^{\alpha}(t))^{n-\beta-1} (D_{F}^{\alpha})^{n}f(t)d_{F}^{\alpha}t$

== See also ==
- Fractional calculus
- Fractional-order system
- Multifractal system

== Bibliography ==
- Chen, Wen (2006). "Time–space fabric underlying anomalous diffusion". Chaos, Solitons and Fractals. 28 (4): 923–929. arXiv:math-ph/0505023. Bibcode:2006CSF....28..923C. doi:10.1016/j.chaos.2005.08.199. S2CID 18369880.
- Kanno, R. (1998). "Representation of random walk in fractal space-time". Physica A. 248 (1–2): 165–175. Bibcode:1998PhyA..248..165K. doi:10.1016/S0378-4371(97)00422-6.
- Chen, W.; Sun, H.G.; Zhang, X.; Korosak, D. (2010). "Anomalous diffusion modeling by fractal and fractional derivatives". Computers and Mathematics with Applications. 59 (5): 1754–8. doi:10.1016/j.camwa.2009.08.020.
- Sun, H.G.; Meerschaert, M.M.; Zhang, Y.; Zhu, J.; Chen, W. (2013). "A fractal Richards' equation to capture the non-Boltzmann scaling of water transport in unsaturated media". Advances in Water Resources. 52 (52): 292–5. Bibcode:2013AdWR...52..292S. doi:10.1016/j.advwatres.2012.11.005. PMC 3686513. PMID 23794783.
- Cushman, J.H.; O'Malley, D.; Park, M. (2009). "Anomalous diffusion as modeled by a nonstationary extension of Brownian motion". Phys. Rev. E. 79 (3) 032101. Bibcode:2009PhRvE..79c2101C. doi:10.1103/PhysRevE.79.032101. PMID 19391995.
- Mainardi, F.; Mura, A.; Pagnini, G. (2010). "The M-Wright Function in Time-Fractional Diffusion Processes: A Tutorial Survey". International Journal of Differential Equations. 2010 104505. arXiv:1004.2950. Bibcode:2010arXiv1004.2950M. doi:10.1155/2010/104505. S2CID 37271918.
