= Path-ordering =

Procedure of ordering a product operators

In theoretical physics, path-ordering is the procedure (or a meta-operator $\mathcal P$) that orders a product of operators according to the value of a chosen parameter:

$$\mathcal P \left\{O_1(\sigma_1) O_2(\sigma_2) \cdots O_N(\sigma_N)\right\}
\equiv O_{p_1}(\sigma_{p_1}) O_{p_2}(\sigma_{p_2}) \cdots O_{p_N}(\sigma_{p_N}).$$

Here p is a permutation that orders the parameters by value:

$$p : \{1, 2, \dots, N\} \to \{1, 2, \dots, N\}$$
$$\sigma_{p_1} \leq \sigma_{p_2} \leq \cdots \leq \sigma_{p_N}.$$

For example:

$$\mathcal P \left\{ O_1(4) O_2(2) O_3(3) O_4(1) \right\} = O_4(1) O_2(2) O_3(3) O_1(4) .$$

In many fields of physics, the most common type of path-ordering is time-ordering, which is discussed in detail below.

== Examples ==
If an operator is not simply expressed as a product, but as a function of another operator, we must first perform a Taylor expansion of this function. This is the case of the Wilson loop, which is defined as a path-ordered exponential to guarantee that the Wilson loop encodes the holonomy of the gauge connection. The parameter σ that determines the ordering is a parameter describing the contour, and because the contour is closed, the Wilson loop must be defined as a trace in order to be gauge-invariant.

== Time ordering ==
In quantum field theory it is useful to take the time-ordered product of operators. This operation is denoted by $\mathcal T$. (Although $\mathcal T$ is often called the "time-ordering operator", strictly speaking it is neither an operator on states nor a superoperator on operators.)

For two operators A(x) and B(y) that depend on spacetime locations x and y we define:

$$\mathcal T \left\{A(x) B(y)\right\} := \begin{cases} A(x) B(y) & \text{if } \tau_x > \tau_y, \\ \pm B(y)A(x) & \text{if } \tau_x < \tau_y. \end{cases}$$

Here $\tau_x$ and $\tau_y$ denote the invariant scalar time-coordinates of the points x and y.

Explicitly we have

$$\mathcal T \left\{A(x) B(y)\right\} := \theta (\tau_x - \tau_y) A(x) B(y) \pm \theta (\tau_y - \tau_x) B(y) A(x),$$

where $\theta$ denotes the Heaviside step function and the $\pm$ depends on if the operators are bosonic or fermionic in nature. If bosonic, then the + sign is always chosen, if fermionic then the sign will depend on the number of operator interchanges necessary to achieve the proper time ordering. Note that the statistical factors do not enter here.

Since the operators depend on their location in spacetime (i.e. not just time) this time-ordering operation is only coordinate independent if operators at spacelike separated points commute. This is why it is necessary to use $\tau$ rather than $t_0$, since $t_0$ usually indicates the coordinate dependent time-like index of the spacetime point. Note that the time-ordering is usually written with the time argument increasing from right to left.

In general, for the product of n field operators A_{1}(t_{1}), …, A_{n}(t_{n}) the time-ordered product of operators are defined as follows:

$$\begin{align}
\mathcal T \{ A_1(t_1) A_2(t_2) \cdots A_n(t_n) \} &= \sum_p \theta(t_{p_1} > t_{p_2} > \cdots > t_{p_n}) \varepsilon(p)
A_{p_1}(t_{p_1}) A_{p_2}(t_{p_2}) \cdots A_{p_n}(t_{p_n}) \\
&= \sum_p \left( \prod_{j=1}^{n-1} \theta(t_{p_j} - t_{p_{j+1}}) \right) \varepsilon(p) A_{p_1}(t_{p_1}) A_{p_2}(t_{p_2}) \cdots A_{p_n}(t_{p_n})
\end{align}$$

where the sum runs all over p's and over the symmetric group of n degree permutations and

$$\varepsilon(p) \equiv \begin{cases}
1 & \text{for bosonic operators,} \\
\text{sign of the permutation} & \text{for fermionic operators.}
\end{cases}$$

The S-matrix in quantum field theory is an example of a time-ordered product. The S-matrix, transforming the state at t = −∞ to a state at t = +∞, can also be thought of as a kind of "holonomy", analogous to the Wilson loop. We obtain a time-ordered expression because of the following reason:

We start with this simple formula for the exponential

$$\exp h = \lim_{N\to\infty} \left(1 + \frac{h}{N}\right)^N.$$

Now consider the discretized evolution operator

$$S = \cdots (1+h_{+3})(1+h_{+2})(1+h_{+1})(1+h_0)(1+h_{-1})(1+h_{-2})\cdots$$

where $1+h_{j}$ is the evolution operator over an infinitesimal time interval $[j\varepsilon,(j+1)\varepsilon]$. The higher order terms can be neglected in the limit $\varepsilon\to 0$. The operator $h_j$ is defined by

$$h_j =\frac{1}{i\hbar} \int_{j\varepsilon}^{(j+1)\varepsilon} \, dt \int d^3 x \, H(\vec x,t).$$

Note that the evolution operators over the "past" time intervals appears on the right side of the product. We see that the formula is analogous to the identity above satisfied by the exponential, and we may write

$$S = {\mathcal T} \exp \left(\sum_{j=-\infty}^\infty h_j\right) = \mathcal T \exp \left(\int dt\, d^3 x \, \frac{H(\vec x,t)}{i\hbar}\right).$$

The only subtlety we had to include was the time-ordering operator $\mathcal T$ because the factors in the product defining S above were time-ordered, too (and operators do not commute in general) and the operator $\mathcal T$ ensures that this ordering will be preserved.

== See also ==
- Ordered exponential (essentially the same concept)
- Dyson series
- Gauge theory
- S-matrix
