= Transition =

Transition or transitional may refer to:

== Mathematics, science, and technology ==
=== Biology ===
- Transition (genetics), a point mutation that changes a purine nucleotide to another purine (A ↔ G) or a pyrimidine nucleotide to another pyrimidine (C ↔ T)
- Transitional fossil, any fossilized remains of a lifeform that exhibits the characteristics of two distinct taxonomic groups
- A phase during childbirth contractions during which the cervix completes its dilation

=== Gender and sex ===
- Gender transition, the process of changing one's gender presentation to accord with one's internal sense of one's gender – the idea of what it means to be a man, woman, both, or neither
  - Gender-affirming care, the physical aspect of a gender transition
  - Gender-affirming surgery, surgical intervention a part of medical gender affirmation

=== Physics ===
- Phase transition, a transformation of the state of matter; for example, the change between a solid and a liquid, between liquid and gas or between gas and plasma
- Quantum phase transition, a phase transformation between different quantum phases
- Quantum Hall transitions, a quantum phase transition that occurred because of the quantum Hall effect
- Transition radiation, contrasts to the Cherenkov radiation
- Atomic electron transition, the transition of an electron from one quantum state to another within an atom
- Beta decay transition, nuclear beta decay determined by changes in spin
- Laminar–turbulent transition, the process of a laminar fluid flow becoming turbulent
- Glass transition, the reversible transition in amorphous materials
- Lambda transition, universality class in condensed matter physics

=== Chemistry ===
- Transition metal, either an element whose atom has an incomplete d sub-shell, or any element in the d-block of the periodic table
- Transition state, of a chemical reaction is a particular configuration along the reaction coordinate
- SRM transition, the precursor and product ion pair in selected reaction monitoring (SRM) in analytical chemistry

=== Computing ===
- A movement between states of an abstract computer, described by a transition system
- A phase of the rational unified process
- A paradigm describing changes of communication mechanisms; see Transition (computer science)

=== Other uses in technology ===
- Terrafugia Transition, a flying car (or drivable airplane)
- Transitions, a brand of photochromic eyeglass lens and sponsor of the PGA Tour Transitions Championship
- "Shifting gears" on a railroad locomotive; see Diesel locomotive#Propulsion system operation

== Government and politics ==
- Brexit withdrawal agreement § Transition period
- Democratic transition, change to a democratic regime
- Peaceful transition of power, a norm or practice in democratic governments, of transitions of power between different political parties
- Social change, often synonymous with social transition
- Spanish transition to democracy, known as "the Transition"
- Transition management (governance)
- United States presidential transition, the transfer of federal executive branch power from the incumbent President of the United States to the president-elect

== Arts and entertainment ==
=== Literature ===
==== Terminology ====
- Transition (fiction), a narrative element or general aspects of writing style that signal changes in a story
- Transition (linguistics), a certain word, expression, or other device that gives text or speech greater cohesion by making it more explicit

==== Works ====
- Transition (literary journal), an experimental literary journal that featured surrealist, expressionist, and Dada art and artists
- Transition (novel), by Iain Banks
- Transition, a novel by Vonda N. McIntyre 1990
- Transition Magazine, a political and literary journal published from 1961 to 1976 on the African continent, and revived in 1991 in the US
- Transitions (novel series), a novel series by R A Salvatore
- Transitions Online, Czech publisher of the Transitions news journal
- Transitions: A Mother's Journey, a graphic novel by Élodie Durand

=== Film, radio, and television ===
- Film transition, a method of juxtaposing two scenes, including:
  - Wipe (transition), a type of film transition where one shot replaces another by travelling from one side of the frame to another or with a special shape
  - Dissolve (filmmaking), a gradual transition from one image to another
- "Transition" (The West Wing), season 7 episode 19 of US television series The West Wing
- Transitions (film), the world's first IMAX film in 3D, 1986
- Transition (1989 film), a film by the Iranian director Kamal Tabrizi
- Transition (2023 film), a documentary film
- Transitions (radio show), a weekly two-hour radio show on Kiss 100 in the UK
- "Transitioning" (Glee), an episode of US television series Glee
- "Transitions" (Law & Order: Special Victims Unit episode), season 10 episode 14 of US television series Law & Order: Special Victims Unit
- "Transitions" (The Wire), an episode of US television series The Wire
- "Transitions", an episode of US television series Without a Trace

=== Music ===
==== Albums ====
- Transition (John Coltrane album), 1970
- Transition (The First Edition album), 1971
- Transition (Buddy Rich Lionel Hampton album), 1974
- Transition (John Miles album), 1985
- Transition (Fly to the Sky album), 2006
- Transition (Ryan Leslie album), 2009
- Transition (Chipmunk album), 2011
- Transition (Steve Lukather album), 2013
- Transitions (John Digweed album), 2006
- Transitions (Aghora album), 2006
- Transitions (Westbound Train album), 2006
- Transitions (EP), 2010 by Canadian post-hardcore band Silverstein

==== Songs ====
- "Transition", by Pestilence from Obsideo, 2013
- "Transition", by Theatre Of Tragedy from Forever Is the World, 2009
- "The Transition", by Hawthorne Heights from The Silence in Black and White, 2004
- "Transitions", by Beastie Boys from Ill Communication, 1994
- "Transitions", by Zao from The Crimson Corridor, 2021

==== Other uses in music ====
- Transition (music), the middle passage of a piece of music
- Transition (band), English indie rock band

=== Other arts ===
- Transitional Style, of furniture and interior design

== Sport ==
- Transition (grappling), in grappling, a move from one grappling hold or grappling position to another
- Transitions Championship, a men's professional golf tournament on the PGA Tour

== Other uses ==
- Transition Glacier, a glacier on the east coast of Alexander Island
- Transitional care, wherein a patient changes health care provider

== See also ==
- The Transition (disambiguation)
- Transition function (disambiguation)
- Change (disambiguation), broadly synonymous
- Fade (disambiguation)
- Gradient (disambiguation)
- Impermanence, also known as the philosophical problem of change
