= Neutron decay =

In nuclear physics, neutron decay may refer to:

- Neutron emission by an atomic nucleus
- Free neutron decay
- Beta decay of a neutron inside an atomic nucleus
- Baryon decay, as predicted by grand unified theories, also involves neutron decay

== See also ==
- Radioactivity
- Particle decay
- Proton decay
- Nucleon decay
