= Free neutron decay =

Decay of a neutron when outside a nucleus

Schematic of free neutron decaying into a proton, electron and electron antineutrino

A free neutron refers to a neutron that is not bound to an atomic nucleus. When embedded in a stable nuclide, neutrons have not been observed to decay. Free neutrons decay with a mean lifetime of 878.4±0.5 s (nearly 15 minutes), which corresponds with a half-life of around 608 seconds.

The free neutron decays via the weak interaction and may be called the simplest example of beta decay. The decay results in the stable resultant products of a proton, electron and an electron antineutrino. This is expressed as a decay equation:

n^{0} → p^{+} + e^{−} + ν̅_{e}

The decay parameters of such a common baryon are of significance across multiple areas of physics, in particular particle physics and cosmology.

Highly precise quantitative measurements of the free neutron mean lifetime by two different methods vary by more than the errors in the measurement techniques. This issue has been called the neutron lifetime puzzle.

== History ==
The neutron was discovered in 1932. In a 1935 article, James Chadwick and Maurice Goldhaber speculated that the free neutron would be unstable, due to its estimated mass being larger than that of a hydrogen atom. In 1948 free neutron decay was first observed, along with a rudimentary estimation of its lifetime. In 1950 the first measurement of the lifetime for free neutron decay was performed. By 2011, there had been more than 20 experiments measuring the neutron lifetime done using several different methods.

== Parameters ==
=== Decay energy ===
Neutron decay is energetically favorable because of the positive decay energy. The decay energy may be calculated as the difference between the rest masses of the neutron and the resultant products. In this case:

$$m_n - m_p - m_e - m_\bar{\nu} = 0.782343 \textrm{MeV}$$

where the calculation is performed in the mass units of $MeV/c^2$ and mass-energy equivalence is used. The decay energy is carried away as kinetic energy of the resultant products.

The maximal energy of the beta decay electron (in the process wherein the neutrino receives a vanishingly small amount of kinetic energy) has been measured at 0.782±0.013 MeV. The latter number is not well-enough measured to determine the comparatively tiny rest mass of the neutrino (which must in theory be subtracted from the maximal electron kinetic energy). Neutrino mass is more accurately constrained by other methods.

=== Decay modes ===
A neutron always decays into a proton, electron and electron antineutrino. However, there are special cases of note.

In about 1% of decays, a photon is also emitted.

n^{0} → p^{+} + e^{−} + ν̅_{e} + γ

This photon may be thought of as a sort of "internal bremsstrahlung" that arises as the emitted beta particle (electron) interacts with the charge of the proton in an electromagnetic way. In this process, some of the decay energy is carried away as photon energy. This mode also occurs in beta decays of bound neutrons, that is, those within a nucleus.

A very small minority of neutron decays (about four per million) are so-called "two-body (neutron) decays", in which a proton, electron and antineutrino are produced as usual, but the electron fails to gain the 13.6 eV necessary energy to escape the proton (the ionization energy of hydrogen), and therefore simply remains bound to it, as a neutral hydrogen atom (one of the "two bodies"). In this type of free neutron decay, nearly all of the neutron decay energy is carried off by the antineutrino (the other "body").

$\text{n}^0 \rightarrow \ ^{1}_{1}\text{H} + \bar{\nu}_e$

== Standard Model ==
The leading-order Feynman diagram for β^{−} decay of a neutron into a proton, electron, and electron antineutrino via a virtual W^{−} boson

In the Standard Model, the free neutron decay is mediated by the weak interaction. In particular, by way of a virtual W^{−} boson a down quark transforms itself into an up quark, an electron and an electron neutrino. This quark change makes the neutron into a proton. Other decay modes of the W^{−} boson are energetically disallowed. This process can be represented as:

d → u + W^{−}

W^{−} → e^{−} + ν̅_{e}

The above is a description of the process in the leading order Feynman diagram. There are higher order processes as well that must be considered when performing quantum field theory calculations. Charge and lepton number are conserved, as they are in all weak interactions.

In bound neutrons of stable nuclides, the nuclear binding energy from the strong interaction makes neutron decay energetically disallowed.

== Significance ==
=== Astrophysics ===
The reverse process of recombination of a proton and an electron into a neutron and a neutrino by electron capture occurs in neutron stars, under the conditions of neutron degeneracy. Similarly, in inverse beta decay, a proton and a sufficiently energetic antineutrino may combine into a neutron and a positron.

The free neutron decay process shares a quantum mechanical matrix element with the cross section of the proton-proton chain reaction.

=== Cosmology ===
The decay lifetime influences models of Big Bang nucleosynthesis, and in particular the proton-neutron ratio in the early universe.

=== Particle physics ===
The decay is a source of data about the low-energy behavior of the weak interaction. The decay lifetime can be used as an input to determine $V_{\mathrm{ud}}$ of the Cabibbo–Kobayashi–Maskawa matrix.

== Lifetime measurement ==
=== Techniques ===
At least three techniques have been used to measure the lifetime of free neutrons. These are the beam method, the bottle method and magnetic traps. The beam method uses a beam of neutrons in high vacuum. When protons and electrons are detected in coincidence, a decay event is counted.

In the bottle method, ultracold neutrons are stored in a material chamber for some amount of time, after which the remaining neutrons are counted via the use of some neutron detector.

Magnetic trapping proceeds similarly to the bottle method, except instead of a physical chamber, magnetic traps exploit the magnetic dipole moment of the neutron to confine the ultracold neutrons.

=== Neutron lifetime puzzle ===
While the neutron lifetime has been studied for decades, there is currently a lack of agreement on its exact value, due to different results from two experimental methods, "bottle" versus "beam" methods. This has been called variously the neutron lifetime puzzle, neutron lifetime problem, or neutron lifetime anomaly.

The neutron lifetime puzzle was realized after the refinement of experiments with ultracold neutrons. The error margins of the two methods previously overlapped, but increasing refinement in technique has failed to demonstrate convergence to a single value. The difference in mean lifetime values obtained as of 2014 was approximately 9 s. Further, a 2018 lattice QCD calculation of the lifetime value was not sufficiently precise to support one over the other.

To give a concrete example of the discrepancy for two specific experiments, in 2013 a beam method experiment found a lifetime of $\ \tau_n = 887.7 \pm 1.2_\mathsf{stat}\ \pm {1.8}_\mathsf{syst}\ \mathsf{s} ~.$ In 2021 a bottle method experiment found a lifetime of $\ \tau_n = 877.75\ \pm 0.28_\mathsf{stat}{\ }^{+0.22}_{-0.16}{}_\mathsf{syst}\ \mathsf{s} ~.$

Additionally, there is also a 3.9 standard deviation disagreement between the results of measurements with storage in material and magnetic traps.

==== Resolution ====
A source of systematic error found in either method could explain the discrepancy. Many different sources of error have been considered for both methods. For example the size of the "bottle" was varied to look for wall effects, then eliminated by using a magnetic bottle, but no change was found.

The discrepancy could potentially be explained by new physics. In particular, alternate decay modes to dark matter candidate particles have been suggested. As of 2026, new physics based on the discrepancy remains speculative.

==== Recent work ====
In 2020, another approach similar to the beam method has been explored with the Japan Proton Accelerator Research Complex (J-PARC), but it is too imprecise at the moment to help analyse the discrepancy.

In 2021, a novel third method using data from the NASA Lunar Prospector mission reported a value of $\ \tau_n = 887\ \pm 14_\mathsf{stat}{\ }^{+7}_{-3}{}_\mathsf{syst}\ \mathsf{s} ~.$

== See also ==
- Halbach array, used in the "bottle" method
- Neutron temperature
- Beta decay transition

== Bibliography ==
- Ерозолимский, Б.Г. (1975). "Beta decay of the neutron" Бета-распад нейтрона [Neutron beta decay]. Успехи Физических Наук Успехи физических наук. 116 (1): 145–164. doi:10.3367/UFNr.0116.197505e.0145.
