= Villamizar =

Villamizar is a surname. Notable people with the surname include:

- Alberto Villamizar (1944–2007), Colombian politician and diplomat
- Jorge Villamizar (born 1970), Colombian musician, singer, and composer
- Mónica Villamizar, Colombian journalist
