= Transition (2023 film) =

2023 film by Jordan Bryon, Monica Villamizar

- Directed by: Jordan Bryon; Monica Villamizar
- Produced by: Monica Villamizar
- Cinematography: Jordan Bryon
- Edited by: Eduardo Resing; Maria Alejandra Briganti
- Music by: Nadim Mishlawi
- Production companies: AGC Unwritten; Our Time Projects; Ruvrika; Tikal Media
- Distributed by: Gravitas Ventures
- Release date: June 8, 2023 (Tribeca Film Festival)
- Running time: 97 minutes
- Country: United States
- Languages: Dari; English; Persian

Transition is a 2023 documentary film directed by journalists Jordan Bryon and Monica Villamizar. The film follows Bryon, who documents the lives of Taliban members in Afghanistan after their takeover of the country, while simultaneously undergoing gender transition as a trans man. The film garnered acclaim from critics, though some critics disliked its portrayal of Afghan society.

== Synopsis ==
Transition begins one year before the fall of Kabul. Jordan Bryon is seen coming out as transgender, and gets his first testosterone shot from a doctor in Afghanistan. The film shows the fighting and aftermath of the Taliban's 2021 offensive, which Bryon covers for international news outlets. Later, Bryon together with Afghan journalist Farzad Fetrat (Teddy) begin to travel with a group of Taliban fighters and document their lives. Here, Transition shows Bryon's struggle with the risk of being outed, which could have severe consequences. Bryon also struggles with his relationship with the Taliban fighters, whom he fraternizes with while being aware of their views and deeds. He becomes particularly close to one Talib called Mirwais. He is also seen with Iranian–Canadian photojournalist Kiana Hayeri. They support each other emotionally, and plan Bryon's mastectomy together. Bryon goes to Iran for his mastectomy, after which he travels to Australia to meet his mother. He makes a brief return to Afghanistan, before leaving the country for Germany together with Fetrat. Intertitles at the end explain that Fetrat got asylum in Germany, while Bryon and Hayeri ended up in Bosnia.

== Production and release ==
Director credit for the film is shared between Bryon and producer Monica Villamizar. Bryon was shooting a film about the Taliban for The New York Times when Villamizar convinced him to turn his personal video diary into a film. Bryon last visited the Taliban unit in June 2022.

Transition premiered at the 2023 Tribeca Festival. The US distribution rights for the film were bought by Gravitas Ventures, which plans to release it in March 2024.

== Reception and analysis ==
According to Variety, Transition premiered to "audience and critical acclaim".

Murtada Elfadl of Variety praises Transition's portrayal of Bryon's personal journey, but says that it requires more context on other people's experiences: "There’s nary a local queer or trans person beyond a brief glimpse of a fellow patient at Bryon’s hospital in Iran." Lovia Gyarkye of The Hollywood Reporter similarly criticizes the film for lacking context, and wishes it would have compared Bryon's experiences to those of local queer people. Bryon agrees that the film has a "white-person lens", which shows an experience that is very different to those of locals. Bryon says he was able to find himself in Afghanistan, and that he enjoyed the lack of knowledge about LGBT people there. Bryon also says he struggled with how he should feel about the Taliban fighters he was embedded with. In the film, he at one point calls them "lovely", to which Hayeri says that he was only able to feel so safe around them because he was a foreigner and a man.

Transition was nominated for the New Directors' Competition at the São Paulo International Film Festival, was an official selection at Sheffield DocFest and Sydney Film Festival, and won the audience award at Human Rights Film Festival Berlin.

On Rotten Tomatoes it has a 100% rating based on 11 reviews.
