= Matrix element (physics) =

Linear operator used in quantum mechanics

In physics, particularly in quantum perturbation theory, the matrix element refers to the linear operator of a modified Hamiltonian using Dirac notation. It is in fact referring to the matrix elements of a Hamiltonian operator which serves the purpose of calculating transition probabilities between different quantum states.

The matrix element considers the effect of the newly modified Hamiltonian (i.e. the linear superposition of the unperturbed Hamiltonian plus interaction potential) on the quantum state.

Matrix elements are important in atomic, nuclear and particle physics.

In simple terms, we say that a Hamiltonian or some other operator/observable will cause a transition from an initial quantum state $| i \rangle$ to a final quantum state $| f \rangle$ if the following holds true:
$$\begin{align}
\langle f | \hat{H} | i \rangle = M^{i,f} \neq 0\\
|\langle f | \hat{H} | i \rangle|^2 = | M^{i,f}|^2,
\end{align}$$
where the last line is the probability amplitude of transition caused by some operator $\hat{H}$ and the matrix element $M^{i,f}$ encapsulating this information. In effect, the calculation involves finding the matrix elements of the H-operator which gives this information of transition between two states. Examples of this can be seen in nuclear physics such as in the beta decay transition, neutrinoless double beta decay and double beta decay.

== Perturbation Theory ==
Consider an unperturbed initial system which can be represented by the following Hamiltonian operator:
$$\hat{H} = \frac{- \hbar^2}{2m}\nabla^2 + V,$$
where $V$ is the potential energy of the system and $m$ the mass of a particle. Solving the Schrödinger equation for a wave-function $| \Psi \rangle$ for the set of separable solutions, we get the following eigenequation for the time-independent Schrödinger equation:
$$\hat{H}^{(0)}_{\psi} | \psi_{n}^{0} \rangle = E_{n}^{0} | \psi_{n}^{0} \rangle.$$
Here, the superscripts represent the perturbation level of correction where 0 represents the unperturbed system and any integers n > 0 represent the levels of correction to the system (e.g. $E_{n}^1$ represents the first order correction to the eigenenergies due to the perturbation). The subscript on the Hamiltonian operator indicates the basis which the Hamiltonian matrix is represented. In this case, it is represented by the $\{ |\psi_{n}^{0} \rangle | n \in \mathbb{N} \}$ basis set. This allows us to put the Hamiltonian in a diagonal matrix form where the diagonal elements are the only non-zero matrix elements of this operator.

Due to the orthonormality of the eigenstates where $\langle \psi_{m}^{0} | \psi_{n}^{0} \rangle = \delta_{nm}$, we can easily observe that the off-diagonal matrix elements are zero:
$$\langle \psi_{m}^{0} | \hat{H}_{\psi}^{0} | \psi_{n}^{0} \rangle = E_{m} \delta_{nm}.$$
Physically, the matrix elements here represent the transition probability amplitude for a particle in eigenstate n to transition to eigenstate m due to the interaction governed by the unperturbed Hamiltonian. Since in the unperturbed Hamiltonian system these eigenstates are uncoupled, $\hat{H}_{\psi}^{(0)}$ will not cause any such transitions to occur. Mathematically, since all the off-diagonal elements are 0, the matrix elements calculated by the above expectation value will always return 0.

Suppose we perturb the system by a linear addition of a new interaction or perturbation Hamiltonian $\hat{H}^{int}$, so our new Hamiltonian will take the following form:
$$\hat{H} = \hat{H}_{\psi}^{(0)} + \lambda \hat{H}^{int},$$
where $\lambda$ represents the perturbation strength and runs from 0 to 1. This new interaction Hamiltonian may have off-diagonal elements V' which are non-zero and thus making the same calculations as above for the matrix elements gives:
$$\langle \psi_{m}^{0} | \hat{H}^{int} | \psi_{n}^{0} \rangle = V'.$$
This result states that by adding a perturbation to the unperturbed Hamiltonian, there is a non-zero probability chance of the eigenstates transitioning between one another. An example of this can be with the electron wave-function in the hydrogen atom and the electrons in helium. If the electron wave-function eigenstates can be represented by the unperturbed Hamiltonian, where $V$-potential energy represents the proton-electron interaction; the helium atom's Hamiltonian will look similar to the hydrogen with the extra term that now represents the new electron-electron interactions since helium has one more electron than hydrogen. In fact, this electron-electron interaction can be succinctly represented by the $\hat{H}^{int} = V'$ new interaction term. This additional perturbation of energy to the initial hydrogen system (the addition of a new electron) will cause the eigenstates to transition since the electromagentic interaction will cause coupling between the electrons.

This makes calculating the matrix elements of the interaction Hamiltonian very important for finding the energy levels and wave-functions of particles in a different atomic elements and nuclide. This many-body Hamiltonian problem becomes very complicated with the addition of more electrons, protons and neutrons as we go to other elements in the periodic table.

== See also ==
- Fermi's golden rule
