= The Transition =

The Transition may refer to:

- The Transition (album), studio album by Muslim Belal
- The Transition (EP), EP by Say No More
- The Transition EP, EP by Philmont
- "The Transition" (song), song by Hawthorne Heights from their album The Silence in Black and White
- Spanish transition to democracy, after the death of Francisco Franco in 1975

== See also ==
- Transition (disambiguation)
