= Particle decay =

Spontaneous breakdown of an unstable subatomic particle into other particles

In particle physics, particle decay is the spontaneous process of one unstable subatomic particle transforming into multiple other particles. The particles created in this process (the final state) must each be less massive than the original, although the total mass of the system must be conserved. A particle is unstable if there is at least one allowed final state that it can decay into. Unstable particles will often have multiple ways of decaying, each with its own associated probability. Decays are mediated by one or several fundamental forces. The particles in the final state may themselves be unstable and subject to further decay.

The term is typically distinct from radioactive decay, in which an unstable atomic nucleus is transformed into a lighter nucleus accompanied by the emission of particles or radiation, although the two are conceptually similar and are often described using the same terminology.

== Probability of survival and particle lifetime ==
Particle decay is a Poisson process, and hence the probability that a particle survives for time t before decaying (the survival function) is given by an exponential distribution whose time constant depends on the particle's velocity:

$$P(t) = \exp\left(-\frac{t}{\gamma \tau}\right)$$

where

$\tau$ is the mean lifetime of the particle (when at rest), and
$\gamma = \tfrac{1}{\sqrt{1-\frac{v^2}{c^2}}}$ is the Lorentz factor of the particle.

=== Table of some elementary and composite particle lifetimes ===
All data are from the Particle Data Group.

Type	Name	Symbol	Mass (MeV)	Mean lifetime
Lepton	Electron / Positron	$\mathrm{e}^- \, / \, \mathrm{e}^+$	0.511	>6.6×10^{28} years
Lepton	Muon / Antimuon	$\mathrm{\mu}^- \, / \, \mathrm{\mu}^+$	105.7	2.2×10^{−6} seconds
Lepton	Tau lepton / Antitau	$\mathrm{\tau}^- \, / \, \mathrm{\tau}^+$	1777	2.9×10^{−13} seconds
Meson	Neutral Pion	$\mathrm{\pi}^0\,$	135	8.4×10^{−17} seconds
Meson	Charged Pion	$\mathrm{\pi}^+ \, / \, \mathrm{\pi}^-$	139.6	2.6×10^{−8} seconds
Baryon	Proton / Antiproton	$\mathrm{p}^+ \, / \, \mathrm{p}^-$	938.2	1.67×10^{34} years
Baryon	Neutron / Antineutron	$\mathrm{n} \, / \, \mathrm{\bar{n}}$	939.6	885.7 seconds
Boson	W boson	$\mathrm{W}^+ \, / \, \mathrm{W}^-$	80400	10^{−26} seconds
Boson	Z boson	$\mathrm{Z}^0 \,$	91000	10^{−26} seconds

== Decay rate ==
This section uses natural units, where $c=\hbar=1. \,$

The lifetime of a particle is given by the inverse of its decay rate, Γ, the probability per unit time that the particle will decay. For a particle of a mass M and four-momentum P decaying into particles with momenta p_{i}, the differential decay rate is given by the general formula (expressing Fermi's golden rule)
$$d \Gamma_n = \frac{S \left|\mathcal{M} \right|^2}{2M} d \Phi_n (P; p_1, p_2,\dots, p_n) \,$$

where

n is the number of particles created by the decay of the original,
S is a combinatorial factor to account for indistinguishable final states (see below),
$\mathcal{M}\,$ is the invariant matrix element or amplitude connecting the initial state to the final state (usually calculated using Feynman diagrams),
$d\Phi_n \,$ is an element of the phase space, and
p_{i} is the four-momentum of particle i.

The factor S is given by
$$S = \prod_{j=1}^m \frac{1}{k_j!}\,$$

where

m is the number of sets of indistinguishable particles in the final state, and
k_{j} is the number of particles of type j, so that $\sum_{j=1}^m k_j = n \,.$

The phase space can be determined from
$$d \Phi_n (P; p_1, p_2,\dots, p_n) = (2\pi)^4 \delta^4\left(P - \sum_{i=1}^n p_i\right) \prod_{i=1}^n \frac{d^3 \vec{p}_i}{2(2\pi)^3 E_i}$$

where

$\delta^4 \,$ is a four-dimensional Dirac delta function,
$\vec{p}_i \,$ is the (three-)momentum of particle i, and
$E_i \,$ is the energy of particle i.

One may integrate over the phase space to obtain the total decay rate for the specified final state.

If a particle has multiple decay branches or modes with different final states, its full decay rate is obtained by summing the decay rates for all branches. The branching ratio for each mode is given by its decay rate divided by the full decay rate.

== Two-body decay ==
This section uses natural units, where $c=\hbar=1. \,$

In the Center of Momentum Frame, the decay of a particle into two equal mass particles results in them being emitted with an angle of 180° between them.

...while in the Lab Frame the parent particle is probably moving at a speed close to the speed of light so the two emitted particles would come out at angles different from those in the center of momentum frame.

=== Decay rate ===
Say a parent particle of mass M decays into two particles, labeled 1 and 2. In the rest frame of the parent particle,
$$|\vec{p}_1| = |\vec{p}_2| = \frac{ \sqrt{[M^2 - (m_1 + m_2)^2][M^2 - (m_1 - m_2)^2]} }{2M}, \,$$
which is obtained by requiring that four-momentum be conserved in the decay, i.e.
$$(M, \vec{0}) = (E_1, \vec{p}_1) + (E_2, \vec{p}_2).\,$$

Also, in spherical coordinates,
$$d^3 \vec{p} = |\vec{p}\,|^2\, d|\vec{p}\,|\, d\phi\, d\left(\cos \theta \right). \,$$

Using the delta function to perform the $d^3 \vec{p}_2$ and $d|\vec{p}_1|\,$ integrals in the phase-space for a two-body final state, one finds that the decay rate in the rest frame of the parent particle is

$$d\Gamma = \frac{ \left| \mathcal{M} \right|^2}{32 \pi^2}  \frac{|\vec{p}_1|}{M^2}\, d\phi_1\, d\left( \cos \theta_1 \right). \,$$

=== From two different frames ===
The angle of an emitted particle in the lab frame is related to the angle it has emitted in the center of momentum frame by the equation
$$\tan{\theta'} = \frac{\sin{\theta}}{\gamma \left(\beta / \beta' + \cos{\theta} \right)}$$

== Complex mass and decay rate ==
This section uses natural units, where $c=\hbar=1. \,$

The mass of an unstable particle is formally a complex number, with the real part being its mass in the usual sense, and the imaginary part being its decay rate in natural units. When the imaginary part is large compared to the real part, the particle is usually thought of as a resonance more than a particle. This is because in quantum field theory a particle of mass M (a real number) is often exchanged between two other particles when there is not enough energy to create it, if the time to travel between these other particles is short enough, of order $\tfrac{1}{M},$ according to the uncertainty principle. For a particle of mass $M + i\Gamma$, the particle can travel for time $\tfrac{1}{M},$ but decays after time of order of $\tfrac{1}{\Gamma}.$ If $\Gamma > M$ then the particle usually decays before it completes its travel.

== See also ==
- Relativistic Breit-Wigner distribution
- Particle physics
- Particle radiation
- List of particles
- Weak interaction
