= Transition function =

In mathematics, a transition function may refer to:

- an easing function, which specifies how a variable transitions between two values over space or time
- a transition map between two charts of an atlas of a manifold or other topological space
- the function that defines the transitions of a transition system in computing, which may refer more specifically to a
  - Turing machine,
  - finite-state machine, or
  - cellular automaton
- a stochastic kernel In statistics and probability theory, the conditional probability distribution function controlling the transitions of a stochastic process

== See also ==
- Non-analytic smooth function#Smooth transition functions
