= Fermi's golden rule =

Transition rate formula

In quantum physics, Fermi's golden rule is a formula that describes the transition rate (the probability of a transition per unit time) from one energy eigenstate of a quantum system to a group of energy eigenstates in a continuum, as a result of a weak perturbation. This transition rate is effectively independent of time (so long as the strength of the perturbation is independent of time) and is proportional to the strength of the coupling between the initial and final states of the system (described by the square of the matrix element of the perturbation) as well as the density of states. It is also applicable when the final state is discrete, i.e. it is not part of a continuum, if there is some decoherence in the process, like relaxation or collision of the atoms, or like noise in the perturbation, in which case the density of states is replaced by the reciprocal of the decoherence bandwidth.

== Historical background ==
Although the rule is named after Enrico Fermi, the first to obtain the formula was Paul Dirac, as he had twenty years earlier formulated a virtually identical equation, including the three components of a constant, the matrix element of the perturbation and an energy difference. It was given this name because, on account of its importance, Fermi called it "golden rule No. 2".

Most uses of the term Fermi's golden rule refer to "golden rule No. 2", but Fermi's "golden rule No. 1" is of a similar form and considers the probability of indirect transitions per unit time.

== Derivation ==
Fermi's golden rule describes a system that begins in an eigenstate $|i\rangle$ of an unperturbed Hamiltonian H_{0} and considers the effect of a perturbing Hamiltonian H' applied to the system. If H' is time-independent, the system goes only into those states in the continuum that have the same energy as the initial state. If H' is oscillating sinusoidally as a function of time (i.e. it is a harmonic perturbation) with an angular frequency ω, the transition is into states with energies that differ by ħω from the energy of the initial state.

In both cases, the transition probability per unit of time from the initial state $|i\rangle$ to a set of final states $|f\rangle$ is essentially constant. It is given, to first-order approximation, by
$$\Gamma_{i \to f} = \frac{2 \pi}{\hbar} \left| \langle f|H'|i \rangle \right|^2 \rho(E_f),$$
where $\langle f|H'|i \rangle$ is the matrix element (in bra–ket notation) of the perturbation H' between the final and initial states, and $\rho(E_f)$ is the density of states (number of continuum states divided by $dE$ in the infinitesimally small energy interval $E$ to $E + dE$) at the energy $E_f$ of the final states. This transition probability is also called "decay probability" and is related to the inverse of the mean lifetime. Thus, the probability of finding the system in state $|i\rangle$ is proportional to $e^{-\Gamma_{i \to f} t}$.

The standard way to derive the equation is to start with time-dependent perturbation theory and to take the limit for absorption under the assumption that the time of the measurement is much larger than the time needed for the transition.

Derivation in time-dependent perturbation theory
Main article: Perturbation theory (quantum mechanics) § Time-dependent perturbation theory === Statement of the problem === The golden rule is a straightforward consequence of the Schrödinger equation, solved to lowest order in the perturbation H' of the Hamiltonian. The total Hamiltonian is the sum of an "original" Hamiltonian H_{0} and a perturbation: $H = H_0 + H'(t)$. In the interaction picture, we can expand an arbitrary quantum state's time evolution in terms of energy eigenstates of the unperturbed system $|n\rang$, with $H_0 |n\rang = E_n |n\rang$. === Discrete spectrum of final states === We first consider the case where the final states are discrete. The expansion of a state in the perturbed system at a time t is $|\psi(t)\rang = \sum_n a_n(t) e^{- i E_n t / \hbar} |n\rang$. The coefficients a_{n}(t) are yet unknown functions of time yielding the probability amplitudes in the Dirac picture. This state obeys the time-dependent Schrödinger equation: $$H |\psi(t)\rang = i\hbar \frac{\partial}{\partial t} |\psi(t)\rang.$$ Expanding the Hamiltonian and the state, we see that, to first order, $$\left(H_0 + H'- \mathrm{i}\hbar \frac{\partial}{\partial t}\right) \sum_n a_n(t) |n\rangle e^{-\mathrm{i}tE_n/\hbar} = 0,$$ where E_{n} and |n⟩ are the stationary eigenvalues and eigenfunctions of H_{0}. This equation can be rewritten as a system of differential equations specifying the time evolution of the coefficients $a_n(t)$: $$\mathrm{i}\hbar \frac{da_k(t)}{dt} = \sum_n \langle k| H'|n\rangle a_n(t) e^{\mathrm{i}t(E_k - E_n)/\hbar}.$$ This equation is exact, but normally cannot be solved in practice. For a weak constant perturbation H' that turns on at t = 0, we can use perturbation theory. Namely, if $H' = 0$, it is evident that $a_n(t) = \delta_{n,i}$, which simply says that the system stays in the initial state $i$. For states $k \ne i$, $a_k(t)$ becomes non-zero due to $H' \ne 0$, and these are assumed to be small due to the weak perturbation. The coefficient $a_i(t)$ which is unity in the unperturbed state, will have a weak contribution from $H'$. Hence, one can plug in the zeroth-order form $a_n(t) = \delta_{n,i}$ into the above equation to get the first correction for the amplitudes $a_k(t)$: $$\mathrm{i}\hbar \frac{da_k(t)}{dt} = \langle k|H'|i\rangle e^{\mathrm{i}t(E_k - E_i)/\hbar},$$ whose integral can be expressed as $$\mathrm{i}\hbar a_k(t) = \int_0^t\langle k|H'(t')|i\rangle e^{\mathrm{i}\omega_{ki} t'} dt'$$ with $\omega_{ki} \equiv (E_k - E_i)/\hbar$, for a state with a_{i}(0) = 1, a_{k}(0) = 0, transitioning to a state with a_{k}(t). The probability of transition from the initial state (ith) to the final state (fth) is given by $$w_{fi} = |a_f(t)|^2=\frac{1}{\hbar^2} \left|\int_0^t \langle f|H'(t')|i\rangle e^{\mathrm{i}\omega_{fi} t'} dt'\right|^2$$ It is important to study a periodic perturbation with a given frequency $\omega$ since arbitrary perturbations can be constructed from periodic perturbations of different frequencies. Since $H'(t)$ must be Hermitian, we must assume $H'(t) = Fe^{-\mathrm{i}\omega t} + F^\dagger e^{\mathrm{i}\omega t}$, where $F$ is a time independent operator. The solution for this case is $$a_f(t) = - \langle f|F|i\rangle \frac{e^{\mathrm{i}(\omega_{fi}-\omega) t}}{\hbar (\omega_{fi}-\omega)} - \langle f|F^\dagger|i\rangle \frac{e^{\mathrm{i}(\omega_{fi}+\omega) t}}{\hbar (\omega_{fi}+\omega)}.$$ This expression is valid only when the denominators in the above expression are non-zero, i.e., for a given initial state with energy $E_i$, the final state energy must be such that $E_f-E_i \neq \pm \hbar \omega.$ Not only must the denominators be non-zero, but they also must not be small since $a_f$ is supposed to be small. Consider now the case where the perturbation frequency is such that $E_k-E_n=\hbar(\omega+\varepsilon)$ where $\varepsilon$ is a small quantity. Unlike the previous case, not all terms in the sum over $n$ in the above exact equation for $a_k(t)$ matters, but depends only on $a_n(t)$ and vice versa. Thus, omitting all other terms, we can write $$i\hbar\frac{da_k}{dt}= \langle k|F|n\rangle e^{i\varepsilon t}a_n, \quad i\hbar\frac{da_n}{dt}= \langle n|F^\dagger|k\rangle e^{-i\varepsilon t}a_k.$$ The two independent solutions are $$a_n = Ae^{ i\alpha_1 t},\, a_k=-A\hbar \alpha_1 e^{ i\alpha_1 t}/\langle n|F^\dagger|k\rangle$$ $$a_n = Be^{-i\alpha_2 t},\, a_k= B\hbar \alpha_2 e^{-i\alpha_2 t}/\langle n|F^\dagger|k\rangle$$ where $$\alpha_1=-\frac{1}{2}\varepsilon+\Omega, \quad \alpha_2 = \frac{1}{2}\varepsilon + \Omega, \quad \Omega = \sqrt{\frac{1}{4}\varepsilon^2 + |\eta|^2}, \quad \eta = \frac{1}{\hbar}\langle k|F|n\rangle$$ and the constants $A$ and $B$ are fixed by the normalization condition. If the system at $t=0$ is in the $|\psi_k\rang$ state, then the probability of finding the system in the $|\psi_n\rang$ state is given by $$w_{kn}=\frac{|\eta|^2}{2\Omega^2}(1-\cos 2\Omega t)$$ which is a periodic function with frequency $2\Omega$; this function varies between $0$ and $|\eta|^2/\Omega^2$. At the exact resonance, i.e., $\varepsilon=0$, the above formula reduces to $$w_{kn}=\frac{1}{2}(1-\cos 2|\eta| t)$$ which varies periodically between $0$ and $1$, that is to say, the system periodically switches from one state to the other. The situation is different if the final states are in the continuous spectrum. === Continuous spectrum of final states === Since the continuous spectrum lies above the discrete spectrum, $E_f-E_i>0$ and it is clear from the previous section, major role is played by the energies $E_f$ lying near the resonance energy $E_i+\hbar\omega$, i.e., when $\omega_{fi} \approx \omega$. In this case, it is sufficient to keep only the first term for $a_f(t)$. Assuming that perturbations are turned on from time $t=0$, we have then $$a_f(t) = -\frac{\mathrm{i}}{\hbar}\int_0^t\langle f|H'(t')|i\rangle e^{\mathrm{i}\omega_{fi} t'} dt' = - \langle f|F|i\rangle \frac{e^{\mathrm{i}(\omega_{fi}-\omega) t}-1}{\hbar (\omega_{fi}-\omega)}$$ The squared modulus of $a_f$ is $$|a_f|^2= 4 | \langle f|F|i\rangle|^2 \frac{\sin^2((\omega_{fi}-\omega)t/2)}{\hbar^2(\omega_{fi}-\omega)^2}$$ Therefore, the transition probability per unit time, for large t, is given by $$\frac{dw_{fi}}{dt} = \frac{d}{dt}|a_f|^2 = \frac{2\pi}{\hbar}| \langle f|F|i\rangle|^2 \delta(E_f - E_i - \hbar\omega)$$ Note that the delta function in the expression above arises due to the following argument. Defining $\Delta = \omega_{fi} - \omega$ the time derivative of $\sin^2(\Delta t/2) / \Delta^2$ is $\sin(\Delta t) / (2\Delta)$, which behaves like a delta function at large t (for more information, please see Sinc function#Relationship to the Dirac delta distribution). The constant decay rate of the golden rule follows. As a constant, it underlies the exponential particle decay laws of radioactivity. (For excessively long times, however, the secular growth of the a_{k}(t) terms invalidates lowest-order perturbation theory, which requires a_{k} ≪ a_{i}.)

Only the magnitude of the matrix element $\langle f|H'|i \rangle$ enters the Fermi's golden rule. The phase of this matrix element, however, contains separate information about the transition process. It appears in expressions that complement the golden rule in the semiclassical Boltzmann equation approach to electron transport.

While the golden rule is commonly stated and derived in the terms above, the final state (continuum) wave function is often rather vaguely described, and not normalized correctly (and the normalisation is used in the derivation). The problem is that in order to produce a continuum there can be no spatial confinement (which would necessarily discretise the spectrum), and therefore the continuum wave functions must have infinite extent, and in turn this means that the normalisation $\langle f|f \rangle = \int d^3\mathbf{r} \left|f(\mathbf{r})\right|^2$ is infinite, not unity. If the interactions depend on the energy of the continuum state, but not any other quantum numbers, it is usual to normalise continuum wave-functions with energy $\varepsilon$ labelled $| \varepsilon\rangle$, by writing $\langle \varepsilon|\varepsilon ' \rangle=\delta(\varepsilon-\varepsilon ')$ where $\delta$ is the Dirac delta function, and effectively a factor of the square-root of the density of states is included into $|\varepsilon_i\rangle$. In this case, the continuum wave function has dimensions of $1/\sqrt{\text{[energy]}}$, and the golden rule is now
$$\Gamma_{i \to \varepsilon_i} = \frac{2\pi}{\hbar} |\langle \varepsilon_i|H'|i\rangle|^2 .$$
where $\varepsilon_i$ refers to the continuum state with the same energy as the discrete state $i$. For example, correctly normalized continuum wave functions for the case of a free electron in the vicinity of a hydrogen atom are available in Bethe and Salpeter.

Normalized derivation in time-dependent perturbation theory

The following paraphrases the treatment of Cohen-Tannoudji. As before, the total Hamiltonian is the sum of an "original" Hamiltonian H_{0} and a perturbation: $H = H_0 + H'$. We can still expand an arbitrary quantum state's time evolution in terms of energy eigenstates of the unperturbed system, but these now consist of discrete states and continuum states. We assume that the interactions depend on the energy of the continuum state, but not any other quantum numbers. The expansion in the relevant states in the Dirac picture is
$$|\psi(t)\rang = a_i e^{-\mathrm{i}\omega_i t}|i\rang + \int_C d\varepsilon a_\varepsilon e^{-\mathrm{i}\omega t} |\varepsilon\rangle,$$
where $\omega_i = \varepsilon_i / \hbar$, $\omega = \varepsilon / \hbar$ and $\varepsilon_i,\varepsilon$ are the energies of states $|i\rangle, |\varepsilon\rangle$, respectively. The integral is over the continuum $\varepsilon \in C$, i.e. $|\varepsilon\rangle$ is in the continuum.

Substituting into the time-dependent Schrödinger equation
$$H |\psi(t)\rang = \mathrm{i}\hbar \frac{\partial}{\partial t} |\psi(t)\rang$$
and premultiplying by $\langle i|$ produces
$$\frac{da_i(t)}{dt} = -\mathrm{i} \int_C d\varepsilon \Omega_{i\varepsilon} e^{-\mathrm{i}(\omega - \omega_i)t}a_\varepsilon(t),$$
where $\Omega_{i \varepsilon }=\langle i|H'|\varepsilon\rangle/\hbar$, and premultiplying by $\langle \varepsilon '|$ produces
$$\frac{da_\varepsilon(t)}{dt} = -\mathrm{i} \Omega_{\varepsilon i} e^{\mathrm{i}(\omega - \omega_i)t} a_i(t).$$
We made use of the normalisation $\langle \varepsilon' |\varepsilon\rangle = \delta(\varepsilon'-\varepsilon)$. Integrating the latter and substituting into the former,
$$\frac{da_i(t)}{dt} = - \int_C d\varepsilon \Omega_{i\varepsilon}\Omega_{\varepsilon i} \int_0^t dt' e^{-\mathrm{i}(\omega - \omega_i)(t-t')} a_i(t').$$
It can be seen here that $da_i/dt$ at time $t$ depends on $a_i$ at all earlier times $t'$, i.e. it is non-Markovian. We make the Markov approximation, i.e. that it only depends on $a_i$ at time $t$ (which is less restrictive than the approximation that $a_i \approx 1$ used above, and allows the perturbation to be strong)
$$\frac{da_i(t)}{dt} = \int_C d\varepsilon |\Omega_{i\varepsilon}|^2 a_i(t) \int_0^t dT e^{-\mathrm{i}\Delta T},$$
where $T=t-t'$ and $\Delta=\omega -\omega_i$. Integrating over $T$,
$$\frac{da_i(t)}{dt} = - 2\pi\hbar \int_C d\varepsilon |\Omega_{i\varepsilon}|^2 a_i(t) \frac{ e^{-\mathrm{i}\Delta t/2}\sin(\Delta t/2)}{\pi\hbar\Delta} ,$$
The fraction on the right is a nascent Dirac delta function, meaning it tends to $\delta(\varepsilon-\varepsilon_i)$ as $t\to\infty$ (ignoring its imaginary part which leads to a very small energy (Lamb) shift, while the real part produces decay). Finally
$$\frac{da_i(t)}{dt} =  - 2\pi\hbar |\Omega_{i\varepsilon_i}|^2 a_i(t),$$
which can have solutions: $a_i(t) = \exp(-\Gamma_{i\to \varepsilon_i} t/2)$, i.e., the decay of population in the initial discrete state is $P_i(t) = |a_i(t)|^2 = \exp(-\Gamma_{i\to \varepsilon_i} t)$ where
$$\Gamma_{i\to \varepsilon_i} = 2\pi\hbar |\Omega_{i\varepsilon_i}|^2 = \frac{2\pi}{\hbar} |\langle i|H'|\varepsilon\rangle|^2.$$

== Applications ==
=== Semiconductors ===
Fermi's golden rule can be used for calculating the transition probability rate for an electron that is excited by a photon from the valence band to the conduction band in a direct band-gap semiconductor, and also for when the electron recombines with the hole and emits a photon. Consider a photon of frequency $\omega$ and wavevector $\textbf{q}$, where the light dispersion relation is $\omega = (c/n)\left|\textbf{q}\right|$ and $n$ is the index of refraction.

Using the Coulomb gauge where $\nabla\cdot \textbf{A}=0$ and $V=0$, the vector potential of light is given by $\textbf{A} = A_0\boldsymbol{\varepsilon}e^{\mathrm{i}(\textbf{q}\cdot\textbf{r}-\omega t)} +C$ where the resulting electric field is
$$\textbf{E} = -\frac{\partial\textbf{A}}{\partial t} = \mathrm{i} \omega A_0 \boldsymbol{\varepsilon} e^{\mathrm{i}.(\textbf{q}\cdot\textbf{r}-\omega t)}.$$

For an electron in the valence band, the Hamiltonian is
$$H = \frac{(\textbf{p} +e\textbf{A})^2}{2m_0} + V(\textbf{r}),$$
where $V(\textbf{r})$ is the potential of the crystal, $e$ and $m_0$ are the charge and mass of an electron, and $\textbf{p}$ is the momentum operator. Here we consider process involving one photon and first order in $\textbf{A}$. The resulting Hamiltonian is
$$H = H_0 + H' = \left[ \frac{\textbf{p}^2}{2m_0} + V(\textbf{r}) \right] +
\left[ \frac{e}{2m_0}(\textbf{p}\cdot \textbf{A} + \textbf{A}\cdot \textbf{p}) \right],$$
where $H'$ is the perturbation of light.

From here on we consider vertical optical dipole transition, and thus have transition probability based on time-dependent perturbation theory that
$$\Gamma_{if} = \frac{2\pi}{\hbar} \left|\langle f|H'|i\rangle \right|^2\delta (E_f-E_i \pm \hbar \omega),$$
with
$$H' \approx \frac{eA_0}{m_0}\boldsymbol{\varepsilon}\cdot \mathbf{p},$$
where $\boldsymbol{\varepsilon}$ is the light polarization vector. $|i\rangle$ and $|f\rangle$ are the Bloch wavefunction of the initial and final states. Here the transition probability needs to satisfy the energy conservation given by $\delta (E_f-E_i \pm \hbar \omega)$. From perturbation it is evident that the heart of the calculation lies in the matrix elements shown in the bracket.

For the initial and final states in valence and conduction bands, we have $|i\rangle =\Psi_{v,\textbf{k}_i,s_i}(\textbf{r})$ and $|f\rangle =\Psi_{c,\textbf{k}_f,s_f}(\textbf{r})$, respectively and if the $H'$ operator does not act on the spin, the electron stays in the same spin state and hence we can write the Bloch wavefunction of the initial and final states as
$$\Psi_{v,\textbf{k}_i}(\textbf{r})=
\frac{1}{\sqrt{N\Omega_0}}u_{n_v,\textbf{k}_i}(\textbf{r})e^{i\textbf{k}_i\cdot\textbf{r}},$$
$$\Psi_{c,\textbf{k}_f}(\textbf{r})=
\frac{1}{\sqrt{N\Omega_0}}u_{n_c,\textbf{k}_f}(\textbf{r})e^{i\textbf{k}_f\cdot\textbf{r}},$$
where $N$ is the number of unit cells with volume $\Omega_0$. Calculating using these wavefunctions, and focusing on emission (photoluminescence) rather than absorption, we are led to the transition rate
$$\Gamma_{cv}=\frac{2\pi}{\hbar}\left(\frac{eA_0}{m_0}\right)^2
|\boldsymbol{\varepsilon} \cdot \boldsymbol{\mu}_{cv}(\textbf{k})|^2 \delta (E_c - E_v - \hbar \omega),$$
where $\boldsymbol{\mu}_{cv}$ defined as the optical transition dipole moment is qualitatively the expectation value $\langle c| (\text{charge}) \times (\text{distance})|v\rangle$ and in this situation takes the form
$$\boldsymbol{\mu}_{cv} =
-\frac{i\hbar}{\Omega_0} \int_{\Omega_0} d\textbf{r}' u^*_{n_c,\textbf{k}}(\textbf{r}')
\nabla u_{n_v,\textbf{k}}(\textbf{r}').$$

Finally, we want to know the total transition rate $\Gamma(\omega)$. Hence we need to sum over all possible initial and final states that can satisfy the energy conservation (i.e. an integral of the Brillouin zone in the k-space), and take into account spin degeneracy, which after calculation results in
$$\Gamma(\omega) = \frac{4\pi}{\hbar}\left( \frac{eA_0}{m_0} \right)^2
|\boldsymbol{\varepsilon}\cdot \boldsymbol{\mu}_{cv}|^2 \rho_{cv}(\omega)$$
where $\rho_{cv}(\omega)$ is the joint valence-conduction density of states (i.e. the density of pair of states; one occupied valence state, one empty conduction state). In 3D, this is
$$\rho_{cv}(\omega) = 2\pi \left( \frac{2m^*}{\hbar^2}\right)^{3/2}\sqrt{\hbar \omega - E_g},$$
but the joint DOS is different for 2D, 1D, and 0D.

We note that in a general way we can express the Fermi's golden rule for semiconductors as
$$\Gamma_{vc}=
\frac{2\pi}{\hbar}\int_\text{BZ} \frac{d\textbf{k}}{4\pi^3}|H_{vc}'|^2
\delta(E_c(\textbf{k}) - E_v(\textbf{k}) - \hbar\omega).$$

In the same manner, the stationary DC photocurrent with amplitude proportional to the square of the field of light is
$$\textbf{J}=
-\frac{2\pi e \tau}{\hbar}\sum_{i,f}\int_\text{BZ} \frac{d\textbf{k}}{(2\pi)^D} |\textbf{v}_i-\textbf{v}_f|(f_i(\textbf{k})-f_f(\textbf{k}))|H_{if}'|^2
\delta(E_f(\textbf{k}) - E_i(\textbf{k}) - \hbar\omega),$$
where $\tau$ is the relaxation time, $\textbf{v}_i-\textbf{v}_f$ and $f_i(\textbf{k})-f_f(\textbf{k})$ are the difference of the group velocity and Fermi-Dirac distribution between possible the initial and final states. Here $|H_{if}'|^2$ defines the optical transition dipole. Due to the commutation relation between position $\textbf{r}$ and the Hamiltonian, we can also rewrite the transition dipole and photocurrent in terms of position operator matrix using $\langle i|\textbf{p}|f\rangle= -im_0\omega\langle i|\textbf{r}|f\rangle$. This effect can only exist in systems with broken inversion symmetry and nonzero components of the photocurrent can be obtained by symmetry arguments.

=== Scanning tunneling microscopy ===
In a scanning tunneling microscope, the Fermi's golden rule is used in deriving the tunneling current. It takes the form
$$w = \frac{2 \pi}{\hbar} |M|^2 \delta (E_{\psi} - E_{\chi} ),$$
where $M$ is the tunneling matrix element.

=== Quantum optics ===
When considering energy level transitions between two discrete states, Fermi's golden rule is written as
$$\Gamma_{i \to f} = \frac{2 \pi}{\hbar} \left|\langle f| H' |i \rangle\right|^2 g(\hbar\omega),$$
where $g(\hbar\omega)$ is the density of photon states at a given energy, $\hbar\omega$ is the photon energy, and $\omega$ is the angular frequency. This alternative expression relies on the fact that there is a continuum of final (photon) states, i.e. the range of allowed photon energies is continuous.

=== Drexhage experiment ===
Both the radiation pattern and the total emitted power (which is proportional to the decay rate) of a dipole depend on its distance from a mirror.

Fermi's golden rule predicts that the probability that an excited state will decay depends on the density of states. This can be seen experimentally by measuring the decay rate of a dipole near a mirror: as the presence of the mirror creates regions of higher and lower density of states, the measured decay rate depends on the distance between the mirror and the dipole.

== See also ==
- Exponential decay – Decrease in value at a rate proportional to the current value
- List of things named after Enrico Fermi
- Particle decay – Spontaneous breakdown of an unstable subatomic particle into other particles
- Sinc function – Special mathematical function defined as sin(x)/x
- Time-dependent perturbation theory – Mathematical approach to quantum physics
- Sargent's rule
