= Mónica Villamizar =

Colombian journalist

- Born: Austin, Texas, United States
- Education: Institut d'Études Politiques
- Occupation: Broadcast freelance journalist
- Known for: Working for PBS News Hour, Univision

Mónica Villamizar Villegas is a Colombian American broadcast freelance journalist, working for PBS Newshour, Univision. She was previously a reporter for Vice News, CBS, Al Jazeera English and ABC News.

== Career ==
Monica Villamizar is a freelance conflict reporter, recently awarded the EMMY Award for Best Investigative Documentary in Spanish and the Gerald Loeb Award for the investigation "The Source", about child labor in Mexico's Nestle coffee farms. In 2016, she was nominated for the prestigious One World Media “Journalist of the Year 2015” Award, which honors the best journalists in the world in all forms of media. Her current clients include PBS Newshour, Al Jazeera English, Vice News, Univision, Telemundo and The Weather Channel. Previously she was the London correspondent for CBS News affiliates. She has traveled to Iraq, Afghanistan, Egypt, Mali, Mexico, El Salvador and Haiti, at times filming directly on the front lines. She has covered the drug of wars in Colombia and Mexico, gaining exclusive access to cocaine cartels in Medellin and Michoacan. In the Middle East she covered the Arab spring and the advance of ISIS into the Iraqi Kurdistan. More recently she has been dedicated to covering the advance of jihadism in West Africa. In her attempts to tell truthful, hard-hitting stories, she has been targeted by the Egyptian military which raided her office in Cairo and arrested her colleagues, and more recently by the Venezuelan Government who targeted her, labeling her a spy, and issuing an arrest warrant for her. In the case of her instance in Venezuela, the editorial board of the New York Times backed her as a reporter, denouncing the Maduro Government. This ignited her interest and active involvement in "Freedom of the Press" campaigns. Villamizar has been a board member of the Frontline Freelance Register, associated with London's Frontline Club, which protects and promotes the integrity of Freelance conflict reporters all over the world.

== Awards ==
In 2017, she received the Emmy Award – Outstanding Investigative Journalism in Spanish, for the documentary Cosecha de Miseria

In 2017, she received the Gerard Loeb Award for Best Video for the documentary Harvest of Misery, NBC Weather Channel and Telemundo.

In 2006, she received a Premio Nacional de Periodismo Simón Bolívar award for the best TV feature or report, for her series of reports on South Africa's peace process broadcast November 2005 on Caracol TV.

== Personal life ==
Villamizar is American and was born in Austin, Texas, United States.

She completed in her education in France, with a master's degree in political science from the Institut d'Études Politiques in Paris.
