= Beta decay transition =

Physical phenomenon

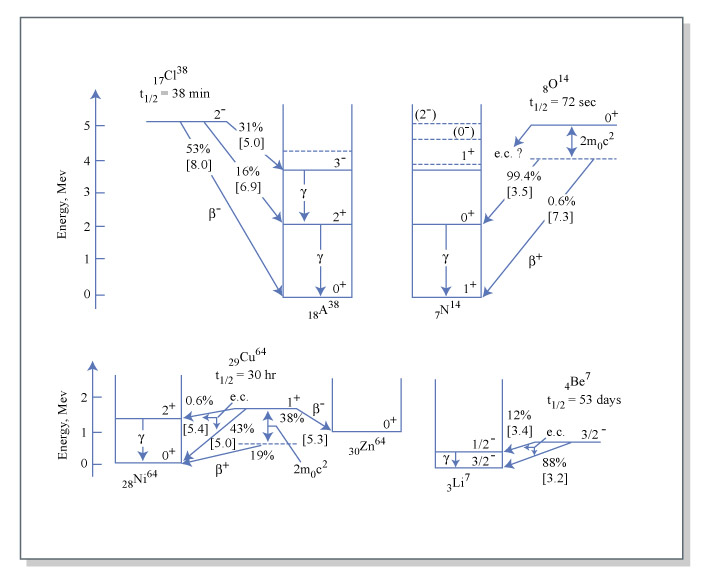
Energy-level diagrams depicting nuclear transitions involving beta decay.

In nuclear physics, a beta decay transition is the change in state of an atomic nucleus undergoing beta decay. A beta particle and a neutrino are emitted from the nucleus. The final state of the nucleus after the beta decay depends on the spins of the outgoing beta particle and the neutrino. The spins can be either parallel, or anti-parallel. This leads to different types of beta decay transition:

- In a Fermi transition, the spins of the two emitted particles are anti-parallel, for a combined spin $S=0$. Spin considerations therefore do not alter the total angular momentum of the nucleus.
- In a Gamow-Teller transition, the spins of the two emitted particles are parallel, with total spin $S=1$. Spin considerations therefore either alter the total angular momentum of the nucleus by one, or leave it unaltered.

Additionally, the beta particle and neutrino may also carry off orbital angular momentum. These forbidden transitions can occur with both Fermi and Gamow-Teller transitions. While "forbidden" may be a misnomer, these types of transitions have longer lifetimes than the allowed Fermi and Gamow-Teller transitions.

In a given unstable nuclide the transitions may be completely Fermi, completely Gamow, or have both types of transitions occurring. Both transition types occur in both $\beta^+$ and $\beta^-$ decays.

== History ==
Fermi's first paper containing his theory of beta decay appeared in 1933. The theoretical framework for describing these transitions was developed between 1934 and 1936 by George Gamow and Edward Teller at George Washington University.

== Selection rules ==
In this article $\mathbf{I}$ indicates the total angular momentum of the nucleus. A superscript $\mathbf{I}^+$ or $\mathbf{I}^-$ indicates an even and odd parity, respectively. The factor of $\hbar$ in the spins and angular momentum is omitted. Parity is conserved in both Fermi and Gamow-Teller transitions.

=== Fermi (anti-parallel) ===
In a Fermi transition, the spins of the outgoing beta particle and neutrino are anti-parallel. This means that one carries a spin of $1/2$ and the other $-1/2$ such that their combination has no associated angular momentum.

Therefore:

$\Delta \mathbf{I} = 0 \Rightarrow$ no change in the total angular momentum of the nucleus

Examples
$${}^{14}_8 \text{O}_6 \rightarrow {}^{14}_7 \text{N}^*_7 + \beta^+ + \nu_\text{e}$$
$$\mathbf{I_i} = 0^+ \rightarrow \mathbf{I_f} = 0^+ \Rightarrow \Delta \mathbf{I} = 0$$

also $\Delta \pi = 0 \Rightarrow$ parity is conserved: $\pi (Y_{\ell\,m}) =(-1)^{\ell}$.

${}^{14}_7 \text{N}^*_{7}$ = excited state of N

=== Gamow–Teller (parallel) ===
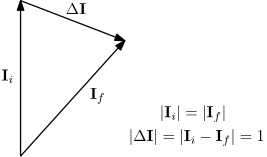
Schematic of Gamow-Teller transition in which $| \mathbf{I_f} | - | \mathbf{I_i} | = 0$ is satisfied.

In a Gamow-Teller transition, the spins of the outgoing beta particle and neutrino are parallel. Each carries a spin of $1/2$. Since they are parallel, a unit of angular momentum is carried away from the nucleus.

Therefore, by conservation of angular momentum, the total nuclear angular momentum must change:

$$| \Delta \mathbf{I}| = | \mathbf{I_f} - \mathbf{I_i} | = 1$$

Since $\mathbf{I}$ is a (axial)vector, this means that we may have:

$$| \mathbf{I_f} | - | \mathbf{I_i} |  = 0, \pm1$$

But in the case that both $\mathbf{I_i} = \mathbf{I_f} = 0$, then the Gamow-Teller transition is disallowed. This is because the triangle property as shown in the figure may not be satisfied with zero length vectors.

Examples
$${}^6_2 \text{He}_4 \rightarrow {}^6_3 \text{Li}_3 + \beta^- + \bar{\nu}_\text{e}$$
$\mathbf{I_i} = 0^+ \rightarrow \mathbf{I_f} = 1^+ \Rightarrow \Delta \mathbf{I} = 1$ also $\Delta \pi = 0 \Rightarrow$ parity is conserved: $\pi (Y_{\ell\,m}) =(-1)^{\ell} \Rightarrow$ the final ^{6}Li 1^{+} state has $L = 1$ and the $\beta + \bar{\nu}_\text{e}$ state has $S = 1$ states that couple to an even parity state.

== Theory ==
=== Gamow-Teller ===
In nuclear transitions governed by strong and electromagnetic interactions (which are invariant under parity), the physical laws would be the same if the interaction was reflected in a mirror. Hence the sum of a vector and a pseudovector is not meaningful. However, the weak interaction, which governs beta decay and the corresponding nuclear transitions, does depend on the chirality of the interaction, and in this case pseudovectors and vectors are added.

The Gamow–Teller transition is a pseudovector transition, that is, the selection rules for beta decay caused by such a transition involve no parity change of the nuclear state.

The spin of the parent nucleus can either remain unchanged or change by ±1. However, unlike the Fermi transition, transitions from spin 0 to spin 0 are excluded.

== Mixed Fermi and Gamow–Teller ==
Due to the existence of the 2 possible final states, each β decay is a mixture of the two decay types. This essentially means that some of the time the remaining nucleus is in an excited state and other times the decay is directly to the ground state. Unlike Fermi transitions, Gamow–Teller transitions occur via an operator that operates only if the initial nuclear wavefunction and final nuclear wavefunction are defined. The Isospin and Angular Momentum selection rules can be deduced from the operator and the identification of allowed and forbidden decays can be found.

Examples
$${}^{21}_{11} \text{Na}_{10} \rightarrow {}^{21}_{10} \text{Ne}_{11} + \beta^+ + \nu_\text{e}$$
$$I_i = \frac{3}{2}^+ \Rightarrow I_f = \frac{3}{2}^+ \Rightarrow \Delta I = 0$$

or

$${}^{21}_{11} \text{Na}_{10} \rightarrow {}^{21}_{10} \text{Ne}^*_{11} + \beta^+ + \nu_\text{e}$$
$$I_i = \frac{3}{2}^+ \Rightarrow I_f = \frac{5}{2}^+ \Rightarrow \Delta I = 1$$

The above reaction involves "mirror nuclei", nuclei in which the numbers of protons and neutrons are interchanged.

One can measure the angular distributions of β particles with respect to the axis of nuclear spin polarization to determine what the mixture is between the two decay types (Fermi and Gamow–Teller).

The mixture can be expressed as a ratio of matrix elements (Fermi's golden rule relates transitions to matrix elements)

:
  
    
      
        y
        ≡
        
          
            
              
                g
                
                  F
                
              
              
                M
                
                  F
                
              
            
            
              
                g
                
                  GT
                
              
              
                M
                
                  GT
                
              
            
          
        
      
    
    {\displaystyle y\equiv {\frac {g_{\text{F}}M_{\text{F}}}{g_{\text{GT}}M_{\text{GT}}}}}
  
[7]

The interesting observation is that y for mirror nuclei is on the order of the value of y for neutron decay while non-mirror nuclear decays tend to be an order of magnitude less.

== Physical consequences ==
=== Conservation of weak vector current ===
The Conservation of Vector Current hypothesis was created out of the Gamow–Teller theory. The Fermi decay is the result of a vector current and is dominant in the decay of the neutron to a proton while the Gamow–Teller decay is an axial-current transition. Conservation of Vector Current is the assumption that the weak vector current responsible for the decay is conserved. Another observation is that the Fermi transitions illustrate how the nucleons inside the nucleus interact as free particles despite being surrounded by mesons mediating the nuclear force. This is useful in considering the barrier tunnelling mechanism involved with alpha decay and in deriving the Geiger–Nuttall law.

==== Forbidden decays ====
The Fermi decays ($\Delta I = 0$) are often referred to as the "superallowed" decays while Gamow–Teller ($\Delta I = 1$) decays are simple "allowed" decays.

Forbidden decays are those which are substantially more improbable and as a result have longer decay times.

Now the angular momentum (L) of the $\beta + \nu$ systems can be non-zero (in the center-of-mass frame of the system).

Below are the observed selection rules for beta decay:

Transition	L	ΔI	Δπ
Fermi	0	0	0
Gamow–Teller	0	0, 1	0
first-forbidden (parity change)	1	0, 1, 2	1
second-forbidden (no parity change)	2	1, 2, 3	0
third-forbidden (parity change)	3	2, 3, 4	1
fourth-forbidden (no parity change)	4	3, 4, 5	0

Each of the above have Fermi ($S = 0$) and Gamow–Teller ($S = 1$) decays.

So for the "first-forbidden" transitions you have

$\vec{I} = \vec{L} + \vec{S} = \vec{1} + \vec{0} \Rightarrow \Delta I = 0,1$ Fermi

and

$\vec{I} = \vec{L} + \vec{S} = \vec{1} + \vec{1} \Rightarrow \Delta I = 0,1,2$ Gamow–Teller

systems.

Notice that $\Delta \pi = 1 \Rightarrow$ (parity violating transition).

The half life of the decay increases with each order:

$$\begin{align}
{}^{22}_{11} \text{Na}_{11} \left(3^+\right) &\rightarrow
{}^{22}_{10} \text{Ne}_{12} \left(2^+\right)
+ \beta^+ + \nu_\text{e} &
t_{1/2} &= 2.6\,\text{years} \\
{}^{115}_{49} \text{In}_{66} \left(\frac{9}{2}^+\right) &\rightarrow
{}^{115}_{50} \text{Sn}_{65} \left(\frac{1}{2}^+\right)
+ \beta^- + \bar{\nu}_\text{e} &
t_{1/2} &= 10^{14}\,\text{years}
\end{align}$$

=== Decay rate ===
A calculation of the β emission decay rate is quite different from a calculation of α decay. In α decay the nucleons of the original nucleus are used to form the final state α particle (^{4}He). In β decay the β and neutrino particles are the result of a nucleon transformation into its isospin complement (n → p or p → n). Below is a list of the differences:

1. The β electron and neutrino did not exist before the decay.
2. The β electron and neutrino are relativistic (nuclear decay energy is usually not enough to make the heavy α nucleus relativistic).
3. The light decay products can have continuous energy distributions (before, assuming the α carried away most of the energy was usually a good approximation).

The β decay rate calculation was developed by Fermi in 1934 and was based on Pauli's neutrino hypothesis.

Fermi's Golden Rule says that the transition rate $W$ is given by a transition matrix element (or "amplitude") $M_{i,f}$ weighted by the phase space and the reduced Planck constant $\hbar$ such that

$$W = \frac{2 \pi}{\hbar} \left| M_{i,f} \right|^2 \times \text{(Phase Space)} = \frac{\ln 2}{t_{1/2}}$$

From this analysis we can conclude that the Gamow–Teller nuclear transition from 0 → ±1 is a weak perturbation of the system's interaction Hamiltonian. This assumption appears to be true based on the very short time scale (10^{−20} s) it takes for the formation of quasi-stationary nuclear states compared with the time it takes for a β decay (half lives ranging from seconds to days).

The matrix element between parent and daughter nuclei in such a transition is:

$$\left| M_{i,f} \right|^2 = \left\langle \psi_\text{Daughter} \phi_\beta \psi_\nu \right| \hat{H}_\text{int} \left| \psi_\text{Parent} \right\rangle$$

with the interaction Hamiltonian forming 2 separate states from the perturbation.

$$\hat{H}_\text{int} = \begin{cases} G_{V}\hat{1} \hat{\tau} & \text{Fermi decay} \\ G_{A}\hat{\sigma} \hat{\tau} & \text{Gamow–Teller Decay} \end{cases}$$

== Weak interaction and beta decay ==
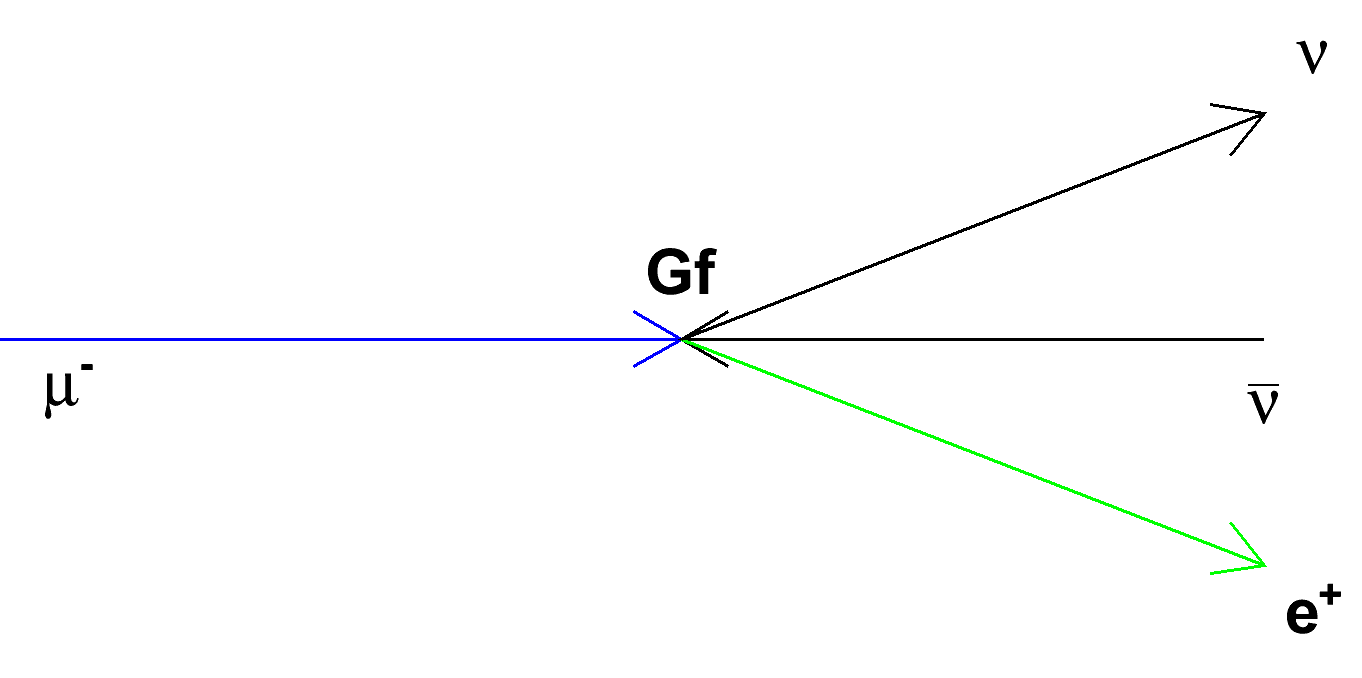
Fermi's interaction showing the 4-point fermion vector current, coupled under the Fermi coupling constant, G_{F}. Fermi's theory was the first theoretical effort in describing nuclear decay rates for beta decay. The Gamow–Teller theory was a necessary extension of Fermi's theory.

Beta decay had been first described theoretically by Fermi's original ansatz which was Lorentz-invariant and involved a 4-point fermion vector current. However, this did not incorporate parity violation within the matrix element in Fermi's golden rule seen in weak interactions. The Gamow–Teller theory was necessary for the inclusion of parity violation by modifying the matrix element to include vector and axial-vector couplings of fermions. This formed the matrix element that completed the Fermi theory of β decay and described parity violation, neutrino helicity, muon decay properties along with the concept of lepton universality. Before the Standard Model of Particle Physics was developed, George Sudarshan and Robert Marshak, and also independently Richard Feynman and Murray Gell-Mann, determined the correct tensor structure (vector minus axial vector, V − A) of the four-fermion interaction. From there modern electroweak theory was developed, which described the weak interaction in terms of massive gauge bosons which was required for describing high energy particle cross-sections.
